

6001–6100 

|-bgcolor=#d6d6d6
| 6001 Thales ||  ||  || February 11, 1988 || La Silla || E. W. Elst || KOR || align=right | 8.6 km || 
|-id=002 bgcolor=#C2FFFF
| 6002 Eetion || 1988 RO ||  || September 8, 1988 || Brorfelde || P. Jensen || L5 || align=right | 40 km || 
|-id=003 bgcolor=#fefefe
| 6003 ||  || — || November 2, 1988 || Kushiro || S. Ueda, H. Kaneda || Vslow || align=right | 4.5 km || 
|-id=004 bgcolor=#fefefe
| 6004 ||  || — || December 11, 1988 || Kushiro || S. Ueda, H. Kaneda || — || align=right | 4.8 km || 
|-id=005 bgcolor=#E9E9E9
| 6005 || 1989 BD || — || January 29, 1989 || Kushiro || S. Ueda, H. Kaneda || — || align=right | 9.2 km || 
|-id=006 bgcolor=#d6d6d6
| 6006 Anaximandros ||  ||  || April 3, 1989 || La Silla || E. W. Elst || KOR || align=right | 7.5 km || 
|-id=007 bgcolor=#fefefe
| 6007 Billevans ||  ||  || January 28, 1990 || Kushiro || S. Ueda, H. Kaneda || — || align=right | 4.1 km || 
|-id=008 bgcolor=#fefefe
| 6008 ||  || — || January 30, 1990 || Kushiro || S. Ueda, H. Kaneda || — || align=right | 3.7 km || 
|-id=009 bgcolor=#fefefe
| 6009 Yuzuruyoshii ||  ||  || March 24, 1990 || Palomar || E. F. Helin || moon || align=right | 10 km || 
|-id=010 bgcolor=#E9E9E9
| 6010 Lyzenga || 1990 OE ||  || July 19, 1990 || Palomar || E. F. Helin || EUN || align=right | 6.3 km || 
|-id=011 bgcolor=#E9E9E9
| 6011 Tozzi ||  ||  || August 29, 1990 || Palomar || H. E. Holt || — || align=right | 7.4 km || 
|-id=012 bgcolor=#E9E9E9
| 6012 Williammurdoch ||  ||  || September 22, 1990 || Siding Spring || R. H. McNaught || — || align=right | 6.2 km || 
|-id=013 bgcolor=#fefefe
| 6013 Andanike || 1991 OZ ||  || July 18, 1991 || Palomar || H. E. Holt || — || align=right | 4.7 km || 
|-id=014 bgcolor=#fefefe
| 6014 Chribrenmark ||  ||  || August 7, 1991 || Palomar || H. E. Holt || V || align=right | 5.6 km || 
|-id=015 bgcolor=#fefefe
| 6015 Paularego ||  ||  || August 7, 1991 || Palomar || H. E. Holt || — || align=right | 6.2 km || 
|-id=016 bgcolor=#fefefe
| 6016 Carnelli ||  ||  || August 7, 1991 || Palomar || H. E. Holt || moon || align=right | 3.5 km || 
|-id=017 bgcolor=#fefefe
| 6017 ||  || — || August 7, 1991 || Palomar || H. E. Holt || FLO || align=right | 3.5 km || 
|-id=018 bgcolor=#fefefe
| 6018 Pierssac ||  ||  || August 7, 1991 || Palomar || H. E. Holt || FLO || align=right | 5.6 km || 
|-id=019 bgcolor=#d6d6d6
| 6019 Telford ||  ||  || September 3, 1991 || Siding Spring || R. H. McNaught || EOS || align=right | 16 km || 
|-id=020 bgcolor=#fefefe
| 6020 Miyamoto ||  ||  || September 30, 1991 || Kitami || K. Endate, K. Watanabe || — || align=right | 5.3 km || 
|-id=021 bgcolor=#fefefe
| 6021 || 1991 TM || — || October 1, 1991 || Siding Spring || R. H. McNaught || V || align=right | 5.5 km || 
|-id=022 bgcolor=#fefefe
| 6022 Jyuro ||  ||  || October 26, 1992 || Kitami || K. Endate, K. Watanabe || — || align=right | 4.2 km || 
|-id=023 bgcolor=#fefefe
| 6023 Tsuyashima ||  ||  || October 26, 1992 || Kitami || K. Endate, K. Watanabe || — || align=right | 4.9 km || 
|-id=024 bgcolor=#fefefe
| 6024 Ochanomizu ||  ||  || October 27, 1992 || Dynic || A. Sugie || — || align=right | 7.6 km || 
|-id=025 bgcolor=#d6d6d6
| 6025 Naotosato ||  ||  || December 30, 1992 || Oohira || T. Urata || EOS || align=right | 18 km || 
|-id=026 bgcolor=#d6d6d6
| 6026 Xenophanes ||  ||  || January 23, 1993 || La Silla || E. W. Elst || — || align=right | 12 km || 
|-id=027 bgcolor=#fefefe
| 6027 Waratah ||  ||  || September 23, 1993 || Siding Spring || G. J. Garradd || FLO || align=right | 7.1 km || 
|-id=028 bgcolor=#E9E9E9
| 6028 ||  || — || March 11, 1994 || Kushiro || S. Ueda, H. Kaneda || RAF || align=right | 7.4 km || 
|-id=029 bgcolor=#fefefe
| 6029 Edithrand || 1948 AG ||  || January 14, 1948 || Mount Hamilton || E. Wirtanen || H || align=right | 2.3 km || 
|-id=030 bgcolor=#d6d6d6
| 6030 Zolensky ||  ||  || March 7, 1981 || Siding Spring || S. J. Bus || — || align=right | 9.3 km || 
|-id=031 bgcolor=#d6d6d6
| 6031 Ryokan ||  ||  || January 26, 1982 || Kiso || H. Kosai, K. Furukawa || EOS || align=right | 16 km || 
|-id=032 bgcolor=#fefefe
| 6032 Nobel || 1983 PY ||  || August 4, 1983 || Nauchnij || L. G. Karachkina || — || align=right | 5.6 km || 
|-id=033 bgcolor=#d6d6d6
| 6033 ||  || — || September 24, 1984 || La Silla || H. Debehogne || — || align=right | 16 km || 
|-id=034 bgcolor=#fefefe
| 6034 || 1987 JA || — || May 5, 1987 || Lake Tekapo || A. C. Gilmore, P. M. Kilmartin || — || align=right | 3.5 km || 
|-id=035 bgcolor=#fefefe
| 6035 Citlaltépetl || 1987 OR ||  || July 27, 1987 || Haute-Provence || E. W. Elst || — || align=right | 4.2 km || 
|-id=036 bgcolor=#E9E9E9
| 6036 Weinberg ||  ||  || February 13, 1988 || La Silla || E. W. Elst || — || align=right | 6.4 km || 
|-id=037 bgcolor=#FFC2E0
| 6037 || 1988 EG || — || March 12, 1988 || Palomar || J. Alu || APOPHA || align=right data-sort-value="0.62" | 620 m || 
|-id=038 bgcolor=#d6d6d6
| 6038 || 1989 EQ || — || March 4, 1989 || Siding Spring || R. H. McNaught || — || align=right | 22 km || 
|-id=039 bgcolor=#d6d6d6
| 6039 Parmenides || 1989 RS ||  || September 3, 1989 || Haute-Provence || E. W. Elst || 7:4 || align=right | 22 km || 
|-id=040 bgcolor=#fefefe
| 6040 ||  || — || February 24, 1990 || La Silla || H. Debehogne || NYS || align=right | 2.8 km || 
|-id=041 bgcolor=#FA8072
| 6041 Juterkilian || 1990 KL ||  || May 21, 1990 || Palomar || E. F. Helin || — || align=right | 3.9 km || 
|-id=042 bgcolor=#FA8072
| 6042 Cheshirecat ||  ||  || November 23, 1990 || Yakiimo || A. Natori, T. Urata || — || align=right | 14 km || 
|-id=043 bgcolor=#fefefe
| 6043 Aurochs ||  ||  || September 9, 1991 || Kiyosato || S. Otomo || V || align=right | 5.0 km || 
|-id=044 bgcolor=#E9E9E9
| 6044 Hammer-Purgstall ||  ||  || September 13, 1991 || Tautenburg Observatory || L. D. Schmadel, F. Börngen || GEF || align=right | 5.9 km || 
|-id=045 bgcolor=#fefefe
| 6045 ||  || — || September 11, 1991 || Palomar || H. E. Holt || — || align=right | 4.6 km || 
|-id=046 bgcolor=#fefefe
| 6046 ||  || — || September 13, 1991 || Palomar || H. E. Holt || — || align=right | 5.3 km || 
|-id=047 bgcolor=#FFC2E0
| 6047 ||  || — || October 10, 1991 || Palomar || P. Rose || APO +1km || align=right data-sort-value="0.98" | 980 m || 
|-id=048 bgcolor=#E9E9E9
| 6048 ||  || — || October 18, 1991 || Kushiro || S. Ueda, H. Kaneda || — || align=right | 6.4 km || 
|-id=049 bgcolor=#fefefe
| 6049 Toda || 1991 VP ||  || November 2, 1991 || Kitami || A. Takahashi, K. Watanabe || — || align=right | 5.2 km || 
|-id=050 bgcolor=#FFC2E0
| 6050 Miwablock || 1992 AE ||  || January 10, 1992 || Kitt Peak || Spacewatch || AMO +1km || align=right | 2.9 km || 
|-id=051 bgcolor=#d6d6d6
| 6051 Anaximenes ||  ||  || January 30, 1992 || La Silla || E. W. Elst || — || align=right | 8.8 km || 
|-id=052 bgcolor=#d6d6d6
| 6052 Junichi ||  ||  || February 9, 1992 || Kitami || K. Endate, K. Watanabe || ALA || align=right | 25 km || 
|-id=053 bgcolor=#FFC2E0
| 6053 ||  || — || January 30, 1993 || Siding Spring || R. H. McNaught || APO +1km || align=right | 3.7 km || 
|-id=054 bgcolor=#fefefe
| 6054 Ghiberti || 4019 P-L ||  || September 24, 1960 || Palomar || PLS || — || align=right | 4.9 km || 
|-id=055 bgcolor=#fefefe
| 6055 Brunelleschi || 2158 T-3 ||  || October 16, 1977 || Palomar || PLS || — || align=right | 3.6 km || 
|-id=056 bgcolor=#E9E9E9
| 6056 Donatello || 2318 T-3 ||  || October 16, 1977 || Palomar || PLS || — || align=right | 12 km || 
|-id=057 bgcolor=#d6d6d6
| 6057 Robbia || 5182 T-3 ||  || October 16, 1977 || Palomar || PLS || 7:4 || align=right | 29 km || 
|-id=058 bgcolor=#fefefe
| 6058 Carlnielsen ||  ||  || November 7, 1978 || Palomar || E. F. Helin, S. J. Bus || — || align=right | 5.3 km || 
|-id=059 bgcolor=#fefefe
| 6059 Diefenbach || 1979 TA ||  || October 11, 1979 || Kleť || Z. Vávrová || — || align=right | 8.2 km || 
|-id=060 bgcolor=#E9E9E9
| 6060 Doudleby || 1980 DX ||  || February 19, 1980 || Kleť || A. Mrkos || — || align=right | 6.8 km || 
|-id=061 bgcolor=#fefefe
| 6061 ||  || — || September 20, 1981 || La Silla || H. Debehogne || FLO || align=right | 4.7 km || 
|-id=062 bgcolor=#d6d6d6
| 6062 Vespa || 1983 JQ ||  || May 6, 1983 || Anderson Mesa || N. G. Thomas || THM || align=right | 17 km || 
|-id=063 bgcolor=#FFC2E0
| 6063 Jason || 1984 KB ||  || May 27, 1984 || Palomar || C. S. Shoemaker, E. M. Shoemaker || APO +1km || align=right | 1.4 km || 
|-id=064 bgcolor=#fefefe
| 6064 Holašovice ||  ||  || April 23, 1987 || Kleť || A. Mrkos || FLO || align=right | 4.4 km || 
|-id=065 bgcolor=#fefefe
| 6065 Chesneau || 1987 OC ||  || July 27, 1987 || Palomar || E. F. Helin, R. S. Dunbar || PHO || align=right | 5.5 km || 
|-id=066 bgcolor=#fefefe
| 6066 Hendricks ||  ||  || September 26, 1987 || Anderson Mesa || E. Bowell || — || align=right | 4.5 km || 
|-id=067 bgcolor=#d6d6d6
| 6067 ||  || — || August 28, 1990 || Kleť || Z. Vávrová || — || align=right | 14 km || 
|-id=068 bgcolor=#d6d6d6
| 6068 Brandenburg ||  ||  || October 10, 1990 || Tautenburg Observatory || F. Börngen, L. D. Schmadel || EOS || align=right | 9.2 km || 
|-id=069 bgcolor=#fefefe
| 6069 Cevolani ||  ||  || August 8, 1991 || Palomar || H. E. Holt || — || align=right | 3.9 km || 
|-id=070 bgcolor=#fefefe
| 6070 Rheinland ||  ||  || December 10, 1991 || Tautenburg Observatory || F. Börngen || NYS || align=right | 4.2 km || 
|-id=071 bgcolor=#E9E9E9
| 6071 Sakitama ||  ||  || January 4, 1992 || Okutama || T. Hioki, S. Hayakawa || — || align=right | 9.6 km || 
|-id=072 bgcolor=#d6d6d6
| 6072 Hooghoudt || 1280 T-1 ||  || March 25, 1971 || Palomar || PLS || — || align=right | 15 km || 
|-id=073 bgcolor=#E9E9E9
| 6073 Tähtiseuraursa || 1939 UB ||  || October 18, 1939 || Turku || Y. Väisälä || EUN || align=right | 8.9 km || 
|-id=074 bgcolor=#fefefe
| 6074 Bechtereva || 1968 QE ||  || August 24, 1968 || Nauchnij || T. M. Smirnova || NYS || align=right | 5.9 km || 
|-id=075 bgcolor=#d6d6d6
| 6075 Zajtsev ||  ||  || April 1, 1976 || Nauchnij || N. S. Chernykh || THM || align=right | 15 km || 
|-id=076 bgcolor=#E9E9E9
| 6076 Plavec || 1980 CR ||  || February 14, 1980 || Kleť || L. Brožek || RAF || align=right | 17 km || 
|-id=077 bgcolor=#E9E9E9
| 6077 Messner || 1980 TM ||  || October 3, 1980 || Kleť || Z. Vávrová || AGN || align=right | 8.3 km || 
|-id=078 bgcolor=#E9E9E9
| 6078 Burt ||  ||  || October 10, 1980 || Palomar || C. S. Shoemaker || GEF || align=right | 6.9 km || 
|-id=079 bgcolor=#d6d6d6
| 6079 Gerokurat ||  ||  || February 28, 1981 || Siding Spring || S. J. Bus || URS || align=right | 22 km || 
|-id=080 bgcolor=#d6d6d6
| 6080 Lugmair ||  ||  || March 2, 1981 || Siding Spring || S. J. Bus || HYG || align=right | 12 km || 
|-id=081 bgcolor=#fefefe
| 6081 Cloutis ||  ||  || March 2, 1981 || Siding Spring || S. J. Bus || — || align=right | 2.5 km || 
|-id=082 bgcolor=#E9E9E9
| 6082 Timiryazev ||  ||  || October 21, 1982 || Nauchnij || L. V. Zhuravleva || — || align=right | 6.9 km || 
|-id=083 bgcolor=#fefefe
| 6083 Janeirabloom ||  ||  || September 25, 1984 || Anderson Mesa || B. A. Skiff || FLO || align=right | 4.0 km || 
|-id=084 bgcolor=#fefefe
| 6084 Bascom || 1985 CT ||  || February 12, 1985 || Palomar || C. S. Shoemaker, E. M. Shoemaker || moon || align=right | 6.3 km || 
|-id=085 bgcolor=#fefefe
| 6085 Fraethi ||  ||  || September 25, 1987 || Brorfelde || P. Jensen || V || align=right | 5.0 km || 
|-id=086 bgcolor=#E9E9E9
| 6086 Vrchlický || 1987 VU ||  || November 15, 1987 || Kleť || Z. Vávrová || — || align=right | 7.6 km || 
|-id=087 bgcolor=#fefefe
| 6087 Lupo || 1988 FK ||  || March 19, 1988 || Palomar || C. S. Shoemaker, E. M. Shoemaker || H || align=right | 1.5 km || 
|-id=088 bgcolor=#d6d6d6
| 6088 Hoshigakubo || 1988 UH ||  || October 18, 1988 || Geisei || T. Seki || — || align=right | 16 km || 
|-id=089 bgcolor=#fefefe
| 6089 Izumi ||  ||  || January 5, 1989 || Ayashi Station || M. Koishikawa || — || align=right | 4.1 km || 
|-id=090 bgcolor=#C2FFFF
| 6090 Aulis || 1989 DJ ||  || February 27, 1989 || La Silla || H. Debehogne || L4 || align=right | 60 km || 
|-id=091 bgcolor=#fefefe
| 6091 Mitsuru ||  ||  || February 28, 1990 || Kitami || K. Endate, K. Watanabe || — || align=right | 4.4 km || 
|-id=092 bgcolor=#fefefe
| 6092 Johnmason || 1990 MN ||  || June 27, 1990 || Palomar || E. F. Helin || — || align=right | 5.4 km || 
|-id=093 bgcolor=#fefefe
| 6093 Makoto ||  ||  || August 30, 1990 || Kitami || K. Endate, K. Watanabe || V || align=right | 5.9 km || 
|-id=094 bgcolor=#E9E9E9
| 6094 Hisako ||  ||  || November 10, 1990 || Okutama || T. Hioki, S. Hayakawa || EUN || align=right | 9.3 km || 
|-id=095 bgcolor=#fefefe
| 6095 || 1991 UU || — || October 18, 1991 || Kushiro || S. Ueda, H. Kaneda || FLO || align=right | 5.3 km || 
|-id=096 bgcolor=#fefefe
| 6096 ||  || — || October 29, 1991 || Kushiro || S. Ueda, H. Kaneda || V || align=right | 4.0 km || 
|-id=097 bgcolor=#fefefe
| 6097 Koishikawa ||  ||  || October 29, 1991 || Kitami || K. Endate, K. Watanabe || V || align=right | 5.2 km || 
|-id=098 bgcolor=#fefefe
| 6098 Mutojunkyu ||  ||  || October 31, 1991 || Kushiro || M. Matsuyama, K. Watanabe || — || align=right | 3.7 km || 
|-id=099 bgcolor=#fefefe
| 6099 Saarland ||  ||  || October 30, 1991 || Tautenburg Observatory || F. Börngen || — || align=right | 6.3 km || 
|-id=100 bgcolor=#fefefe
| 6100 Kunitomoikkansai ||  ||  || November 9, 1991 || Dynic || A. Sugie || moon || align=right | 4.1 km || 
|}

6101–6200 

|-bgcolor=#fefefe
| 6101 Tomoki || 1993 EG ||  || March 1, 1993 || Oohira || T. Urata || FLO || align=right | 4.3 km || 
|-id=102 bgcolor=#E9E9E9
| 6102 Visby ||  ||  || March 21, 1993 || La Silla || UESAC || — || align=right | 4.5 km || 
|-id=103 bgcolor=#d6d6d6
| 6103 || 1993 HV || — || April 16, 1993 || Kushiro || S. Ueda, H. Kaneda || 7:4 || align=right | 29 km || 
|-id=104 bgcolor=#E9E9E9
| 6104 Takao || 1993 HZ ||  || April 16, 1993 || Kitami || K. Endate, K. Watanabe || — || align=right | 8.6 km || 
|-id=105 bgcolor=#E9E9E9
| 6105 Verrocchio || 4580 P-L ||  || September 24, 1960 || Palomar || PLS || ADE || align=right | 4.1 km || 
|-id=106 bgcolor=#d6d6d6
| 6106 Stoss || 6564 P-L ||  || September 24, 1960 || Palomar || PLS || THM || align=right | 14 km || 
|-id=107 bgcolor=#fefefe
| 6107 Osterbrock || 1948 AF ||  || January 14, 1948 || Mount Hamilton || C. A. Wirtanen || H || align=right | 4.4 km || 
|-id=108 bgcolor=#fefefe
| 6108 Glebov || 1971 QN ||  || August 18, 1971 || Nauchnij || T. M. Smirnova || — || align=right | 3.4 km || 
|-id=109 bgcolor=#fefefe
| 6109 Balseiro || 1975 QC ||  || August 29, 1975 || El Leoncito || Félix Aguilar Obs. || V || align=right | 4.6 km || 
|-id=110 bgcolor=#fefefe
| 6110 Kazak ||  ||  || July 4, 1978 || Nauchnij || L. I. Chernykh || — || align=right | 3.3 km || 
|-id=111 bgcolor=#fefefe
| 6111 Davemckay ||  ||  || September 20, 1979 || Palomar || S. J. Bus || — || align=right | 8.7 km || 
|-id=112 bgcolor=#d6d6d6
| 6112 Ludolfschultz ||  ||  || February 28, 1981 || Siding Spring || S. J. Bus || — || align=right | 7.9 km || 
|-id=113 bgcolor=#E9E9E9
| 6113 Tsap ||  ||  || September 16, 1982 || Nauchnij || L. I. Chernykh || — || align=right | 13 km || 
|-id=114 bgcolor=#fefefe
| 6114 Dalla-Degregori ||  ||  || April 28, 1984 || La Silla || W. Ferreri || — || align=right | 4.0 km || 
|-id=115 bgcolor=#fefefe
| 6115 Martinduncan ||  ||  || September 25, 1984 || Anderson Mesa || B. A. Skiff || FLO || align=right | 4.9 km || 
|-id=116 bgcolor=#d6d6d6
| 6116 Still ||  ||  || October 26, 1984 || Anderson Mesa || E. Bowell || — || align=right | 8.9 km || 
|-id=117 bgcolor=#fefefe
| 6117 Brevardastro ||  ||  || February 12, 1985 || La Silla || H. Debehogne || V || align=right | 5.2 km || 
|-id=118 bgcolor=#fefefe
| 6118 Mayuboshi ||  ||  || August 31, 1986 || La Silla || H. Debehogne || — || align=right | 11 km || 
|-id=119 bgcolor=#E9E9E9
| 6119 Hjorth || 1986 XH ||  || December 6, 1986 || Brorfelde || P. Jensen || EUN || align=right | 6.4 km || 
|-id=120 bgcolor=#fefefe
| 6120 Anhalt || 1987 QR ||  || August 21, 1987 || Tautenburg Observatory || F. Börngen || — || align=right | 4.8 km || 
|-id=121 bgcolor=#fefefe
| 6121 Plachinda ||  ||  || September 2, 1987 || Nauchnij || L. I. Chernykh || — || align=right | 5.4 km || 
|-id=122 bgcolor=#fefefe
| 6122 Henrard ||  ||  || September 21, 1987 || Anderson Mesa || E. Bowell || — || align=right | 9.0 km || 
|-id=123 bgcolor=#fefefe
| 6123 Aristoteles ||  ||  || September 19, 1987 || Smolyan || E. W. Elst || — || align=right | 6.9 km || 
|-id=124 bgcolor=#d6d6d6
| 6124 Mecklenburg ||  ||  || September 29, 1987 || Tautenburg Observatory || F. Börngen || HIL3:2 || align=right | 20 km || 
|-id=125 bgcolor=#fefefe
| 6125 Singto || 1989 CN ||  || February 4, 1989 || Kushiro || S. Ueda, H. Kaneda || — || align=right | 4.0 km || 
|-id=126 bgcolor=#fefefe
| 6126 Hubelmatt ||  ||  || March 5, 1989 || Kleť || Z. Vávrová || — || align=right | 4.8 km || 
|-id=127 bgcolor=#E9E9E9
| 6127 Hetherington || 1989 HD ||  || April 25, 1989 || Palomar || E. F. Helin || EUN || align=right | 5.5 km || 
|-id=128 bgcolor=#E9E9E9
| 6128 Lasorda || 1989 LA ||  || June 3, 1989 || Palomar || E. F. Helin || — || align=right | 11 km || 
|-id=129 bgcolor=#E9E9E9
| 6129 Demokritos ||  ||  || September 4, 1989 || Haute-Provence || E. W. Elst || DOR || align=right | 17 km || 
|-id=130 bgcolor=#FA8072
| 6130 Hutton ||  ||  || September 24, 1989 || Siding Spring || R. H. McNaught || unusual || align=right | 3.1 km || 
|-id=131 bgcolor=#fefefe
| 6131 Towen ||  ||  || July 27, 1990 || Palomar || H. E. Holt || V || align=right | 4.0 km || 
|-id=132 bgcolor=#fefefe
| 6132 Danielson ||  ||  || August 22, 1990 || Palomar || H. E. Holt || — || align=right | 5.0 km || 
|-id=133 bgcolor=#fefefe
| 6133 Royaldutchastro ||  ||  || September 14, 1990 || Palomar || H. E. Holt || — || align=right | 9.5 km || 
|-id=134 bgcolor=#E9E9E9
| 6134 Kamagari ||  ||  || September 15, 1990 || Palomar || H. E. Holt || EUN || align=right | 5.2 km || 
|-id=135 bgcolor=#fefefe
| 6135 Billowen ||  ||  || September 14, 1990 || Palomar || H. E. Holt || — || align=right | 11 km || 
|-id=136 bgcolor=#d6d6d6
| 6136 Gryphon || 1990 YH ||  || December 22, 1990 || Yakiimo || A. Natori, T. Urata || EOS || align=right | 16 km || 
|-id=137 bgcolor=#d6d6d6
| 6137 Johnfletcher || 1991 BY ||  || January 25, 1991 || Yakiimo || A. Natori, T. Urata || — || align=right | 31 km || 
|-id=138 bgcolor=#fefefe
| 6138 Miguelhernández ||  ||  || May 14, 1991 || Kiyosato || S. Otomo, O. Muramatsu || NYS || align=right | 4.8 km || 
|-id=139 bgcolor=#E9E9E9
| 6139 Naomi ||  ||  || January 10, 1992 || Dynic || A. Sugie || — || align=right | 9.5 km || 
|-id=140 bgcolor=#fefefe
| 6140 Kubokawa ||  ||  || January 6, 1992 || Kitami || K. Endate, K. Watanabe || — || align=right | 5.9 km || 
|-id=141 bgcolor=#FA8072
| 6141 Durda ||  ||  || December 26, 1992 || Kitt Peak || Spacewatch || Hslow || align=right | 3.8 km || 
|-id=142 bgcolor=#fefefe
| 6142 Tantawi || 1993 FP ||  || March 23, 1993 || Lake Tekapo || A. C. Gilmore, P. M. Kilmartin || NYS || align=right | 9.2 km || 
|-id=143 bgcolor=#d6d6d6
| 6143 Pythagoras || 1993 JV ||  || May 14, 1993 || La Silla || E. W. Elst || KOR || align=right | 8.0 km || 
|-id=144 bgcolor=#B88A00
| 6144 Kondojiro ||  ||  || March 14, 1994 || Kitami || K. Endate, K. Watanabe || Tj (2.87) || align=right | 32 km || 
|-id=145 bgcolor=#fefefe
| 6145 Riemenschneider || 2630 P-L ||  || September 26, 1960 || Palomar || PLS || NYS || align=right | 3.1 km || 
|-id=146 bgcolor=#fefefe
| 6146 Adamkrafft || 3262 T-2 ||  || September 30, 1973 || Palomar || PLS || — || align=right | 5.2 km || 
|-id=147 bgcolor=#E9E9E9
| 6147 Straub || 1081 T-3 ||  || October 17, 1977 || Palomar || PLS || — || align=right | 7.0 km || 
|-id=148 bgcolor=#fefefe
| 6148 Ignazgünther || 5119 T-3 ||  || October 16, 1977 || Palomar || PLS || PHO || align=right | 4.7 km || 
|-id=149 bgcolor=#fefefe
| 6149 Pelčák || 1979 SS ||  || September 25, 1979 || Kleť || A. Mrkos || — || align=right | 4.0 km || 
|-id=150 bgcolor=#d6d6d6
| 6150 Neukum ||  ||  || March 16, 1980 || La Silla || C.-I. Lagerkvist || HYG || align=right | 12 km || 
|-id=151 bgcolor=#fefefe
| 6151 Viget || 1987 WF ||  || November 19, 1987 || Anderson Mesa || E. Bowell || — || align=right | 5.3 km || 
|-id=152 bgcolor=#E9E9E9
| 6152 Empedocles ||  ||  || April 3, 1989 || La Silla || E. W. Elst || — || align=right | 6.9 km || 
|-id=153 bgcolor=#d6d6d6
| 6153 Hershey || 1990 OB ||  || July 19, 1990 || Palomar || E. F. Helin || — || align=right | 19 km || 
|-id=154 bgcolor=#fefefe
| 6154 Stevesynnott ||  ||  || August 22, 1990 || Palomar || H. E. Holt || NYS || align=right | 3.4 km || 
|-id=155 bgcolor=#E9E9E9
| 6155 Yokosugano ||  ||  || November 11, 1990 || Minami-Oda || T. Nomura, K. Kawanishi || — || align=right | 5.8 km || 
|-id=156 bgcolor=#d6d6d6
| 6156 Dall ||  ||  || January 12, 1991 || Stakenbridge || B. G. W. Manning || EOS || align=right | 11 km || 
|-id=157 bgcolor=#fefefe
| 6157 Prey ||  ||  || September 9, 1991 || Tautenburg Observatory || L. D. Schmadel, F. Börngen || — || align=right | 3.5 km || 
|-id=158 bgcolor=#fefefe
| 6158 Shosanbetsu ||  ||  || November 12, 1991 || Ojima || T. Niijima, T. Urata || — || align=right | 4.5 km || 
|-id=159 bgcolor=#fefefe
| 6159 Andréseloy || 1991 YH ||  || December 30, 1991 || Kushiro || S. Ueda, H. Kaneda || V || align=right | 5.3 km || 
|-id=160 bgcolor=#fefefe
| 6160 Minakata || 1993 JF ||  || May 15, 1993 || Nachi-Katsuura || Y. Shimizu, T. Urata || FLO || align=right | 4.1 km || 
|-id=161 bgcolor=#E9E9E9
| 6161 Vojno-Yasenetsky ||  ||  || October 14, 1971 || Nauchnij || L. I. Chernykh || CLO || align=right | 17 km || 
|-id=162 bgcolor=#E9E9E9
| 6162 Prokhorov ||  ||  || September 25, 1973 || Nauchnij || L. V. Zhuravleva || — || align=right | 6.1 km || 
|-id=163 bgcolor=#fefefe
| 6163 Reimers || 1977 FT ||  || March 16, 1977 || La Silla || H.-E. Schuster || H || align=right | 2.4 km || 
|-id=164 bgcolor=#fefefe
| 6164 Gerhardmüller ||  ||  || September 9, 1977 || Nauchnij || N. S. Chernykh || FLO || align=right | 4.9 km || 
|-id=165 bgcolor=#fefefe
| 6165 Frolova ||  ||  || August 8, 1978 || Nauchnij || N. S. Chernykh || V || align=right | 3.4 km || 
|-id=166 bgcolor=#d6d6d6
| 6166 Univsima ||  ||  || September 27, 1978 || Nauchnij || L. I. Chernykh || EOS || align=right | 12 km || 
|-id=167 bgcolor=#fefefe
| 6167 Narmanskij ||  ||  || August 27, 1979 || Nauchnij || N. S. Chernykh || NYS || align=right | 4.0 km || 
|-id=168 bgcolor=#d6d6d6
| 6168 Isnello ||  ||  || March 5, 1981 || La Silla || H. Debehogne, G. DeSanctis || — || align=right | 10 km || 
|-id=169 bgcolor=#d6d6d6
| 6169 Sashakrot ||  ||  || March 2, 1981 || Siding Spring || S. J. Bus || slow || align=right | 10 km || 
|-id=170 bgcolor=#FA8072
| 6170 Levasseur || 1981 GP ||  || April 5, 1981 || Anderson Mesa || E. Bowell || PHO || align=right | 5.7 km || 
|-id=171 bgcolor=#fefefe
| 6171 Uttorp || 1981 UT ||  || October 26, 1981 || Socorro || L. G. Taff || — || align=right | 3.5 km || 
|-id=172 bgcolor=#FA8072
| 6172 Prokofeana || 1982 TX ||  || October 14, 1982 || Nauchnij || L. G. Karachkina || — || align=right | 2.7 km || 
|-id=173 bgcolor=#E9E9E9
| 6173 Jimwestphal || 1983 AD ||  || January 9, 1983 || Anderson Mesa || B. A. Skiff || — || align=right | 7.8 km || 
|-id=174 bgcolor=#d6d6d6
| 6174 Polybius ||  ||  || October 4, 1983 || Anderson Mesa || N. G. Thomas || — || align=right | 21 km || 
|-id=175 bgcolor=#d6d6d6
| 6175 Cori || 1983 XW ||  || December 4, 1983 || Kleť || A. Mrkos || THM || align=right | 15 km || 
|-id=176 bgcolor=#fefefe
| 6176 Horrigan || 1985 BH ||  || January 16, 1985 || Kleť || Z. Vávrová || FLO || align=right | 5.6 km || 
|-id=177 bgcolor=#fefefe
| 6177 Fécamp ||  ||  || February 12, 1986 || La Silla || H. Debehogne || FLO || align=right | 4.8 km || 
|-id=178 bgcolor=#FFC2E0
| 6178 || 1986 DA || — || February 16, 1986 || Shizuoka || M. Kizawa || AMO +1km || align=right | 2.3 km || 
|-id=179 bgcolor=#fefefe
| 6179 Brett || 1986 EN ||  || March 3, 1986 || Palomar || C. S. Shoemaker, E. M. Shoemaker || PHO || align=right | 5.2 km || 
|-id=180 bgcolor=#fefefe
| 6180 Bystritskaya ||  ||  || August 8, 1986 || Nauchnij || L. I. Chernykh || — || align=right | 4.4 km || 
|-id=181 bgcolor=#fefefe
| 6181 Bobweber || 1986 RW ||  || September 6, 1986 || Palomar || E. F. Helin || moon || align=right | 4.5 km || 
|-id=182 bgcolor=#fefefe
| 6182 Katygord ||  ||  || September 21, 1987 || Anderson Mesa || E. Bowell || — || align=right | 5.2 km || 
|-id=183 bgcolor=#FA8072
| 6183 Viscome ||  ||  || September 26, 1987 || Palomar || C. S. Shoemaker || slow || align=right | 6.8 km || 
|-id=184 bgcolor=#fefefe
| 6184 Nordlund ||  ||  || October 26, 1987 || Brorfelde || P. Jensen || — || align=right | 4.7 km || 
|-id=185 bgcolor=#fefefe
| 6185 Mitsuma || 1987 YD ||  || December 20, 1987 || Chiyoda || T. Kojima || — || align=right | 9.9 km || 
|-id=186 bgcolor=#fefefe
| 6186 Zenon ||  ||  || February 11, 1988 || La Silla || E. W. Elst || moon || align=right | 5.1 km || 
|-id=187 bgcolor=#d6d6d6
| 6187 Kagura ||  ||  || September 2, 1988 || La Silla || H. Debehogne || THM || align=right | 14 km || 
|-id=188 bgcolor=#d6d6d6
| 6188 Robertpepin ||  ||  || September 16, 1988 || Cerro Tololo || S. J. Bus || THM || align=right | 12 km || 
|-id=189 bgcolor=#fefefe
| 6189 Völk ||  ||  || March 2, 1989 || La Silla || E. W. Elst || V || align=right | 4.0 km || 
|-id=190 bgcolor=#E9E9E9
| 6190 Rennes ||  ||  || October 8, 1989 || Ayashi Station || M. Koishikawa || — || align=right | 9.4 km || 
|-id=191 bgcolor=#d6d6d6
| 6191 Eades ||  ||  || November 22, 1989 || Stakenbridge || B. G. W. Manning || TEL || align=right | 7.6 km || 
|-id=192 bgcolor=#fefefe
| 6192 Javiergorosabel ||  ||  || May 21, 1990 || Palomar || E. F. Helin || — || align=right | 6.5 km || 
|-id=193 bgcolor=#fefefe
| 6193 Manabe ||  ||  || August 18, 1990 || Kitami || K. Endate, K. Watanabe || — || align=right | 9.7 km || 
|-id=194 bgcolor=#fefefe
| 6194 Denali || 1990 TN ||  || October 12, 1990 || Siding Spring || R. H. McNaught || — || align=right | 7.2 km || 
|-id=195 bgcolor=#E9E9E9
| 6195 Nukariya ||  ||  || November 13, 1990 || Kitami || K. Endate, K. Watanabe || — || align=right | 4.8 km || 
|-id=196 bgcolor=#fefefe
| 6196 Bernardbowen ||  ||  || October 28, 1991 || Kushiro || S. Ueda, H. Kaneda || — || align=right | 5.0 km || 
|-id=197 bgcolor=#fefefe
| 6197 Taracho ||  ||  || January 10, 1992 || Karasuyama || S. Inoda, T. Urata || V || align=right | 4.5 km || 
|-id=198 bgcolor=#fefefe
| 6198 Shirakawa ||  ||  || January 10, 1992 || Okutama || T. Hioki, S. Hayakawa || FLO || align=right | 4.2 km || 
|-id=199 bgcolor=#E9E9E9
| 6199 Yoshiokayayoi ||  ||  || January 26, 1992 || Dynic || A. Sugie || EUN || align=right | 9.7 km || 
|-id=200 bgcolor=#fefefe
| 6200 Hachinohe || 1993 HL ||  || April 16, 1993 || Kitami || K. Endate, K. Watanabe || — || align=right | 4.6 km || 
|}

6201–6300 

|-bgcolor=#E9E9E9
| 6201 Ichiroshimizu || 1993 HY ||  || April 16, 1993 || Kitami || K. Endate, K. Watanabe || — || align=right | 5.7 km || 
|-id=202 bgcolor=#fefefe
| 6202 Georgemiley || 3332 T-1 ||  || March 26, 1971 || Palomar || PLS || NYS || align=right | 2.5 km || 
|-id=203 bgcolor=#d6d6d6
| 6203 Lyubamoroz ||  ||  || March 3, 1981 || Siding Spring || S. J. Bus || — || align=right | 9.0 km || 
|-id=204 bgcolor=#fefefe
| 6204 MacKenzie ||  ||  || May 6, 1981 || Palomar || C. S. Shoemaker || FLO || align=right | 2.9 km || 
|-id=205 bgcolor=#fefefe
| 6205 Menottigalli || 1983 OD ||  || July 17, 1983 || Anderson Mesa || E. Bowell || — || align=right | 8.2 km || 
|-id=206 bgcolor=#d6d6d6
| 6206 Corradolamberti ||  ||  || October 15, 1985 || Anderson Mesa || E. Bowell || KOR || align=right | 5.9 km || 
|-id=207 bgcolor=#fefefe
| 6207 Bourvil || 1988 BV ||  || January 24, 1988 || Kushiro || S. Ueda, H. Kaneda || NYS || align=right | 3.3 km || 
|-id=208 bgcolor=#fefefe
| 6208 Wakata || 1988 XT ||  || December 3, 1988 || Kitami || K. Endate, K. Watanabe || — || align=right | 5.0 km || 
|-id=209 bgcolor=#fefefe
| 6209 Schwaben ||  ||  || October 12, 1990 || Tautenburg Observatory || F. Börngen, L. D. Schmadel || NYS || align=right | 4.7 km || 
|-id=210 bgcolor=#d6d6d6
| 6210 Hyunseop ||  ||  || January 14, 1991 || Kushiro || M. Matsuyama, K. Watanabe || KOR || align=right | 8.7 km || 
|-id=211 bgcolor=#E9E9E9
| 6211 Tsubame || 1991 DO ||  || February 19, 1991 || Karasuyama || S. Inoda, T. Urata || GEF || align=right | 5.8 km || 
|-id=212 bgcolor=#fefefe
| 6212 Franzthaler ||  ||  || June 23, 1993 || Palomar || M. Nassir || — || align=right | 11 km || 
|-id=213 bgcolor=#fefefe
| 6213 Zwiers || 2196 P-L ||  || September 24, 1960 || Palomar || PLS || — || align=right | 2.8 km || 
|-id=214 bgcolor=#d6d6d6
| 6214 Mikhailgrinev ||  ||  || September 26, 1971 || Nauchnij || T. M. Smirnova || THM || align=right | 17 km || 
|-id=215 bgcolor=#E9E9E9
| 6215 Mehdia || 1973 EK ||  || March 7, 1973 || Hamburg-Bergedorf || L. Kohoutek || — || align=right | 13 km || 
|-id=216 bgcolor=#E9E9E9
| 6216 San Jose || 1975 SJ ||  || September 30, 1975 || Palomar || S. J. Bus || — || align=right | 8.0 km || 
|-id=217 bgcolor=#fefefe
| 6217 Kodai || 1975 XH ||  || December 1, 1975 || Cerro El Roble || C. Torres, S. Barros || — || align=right | 8.3 km || 
|-id=218 bgcolor=#fefefe
| 6218 Mizushima ||  ||  || March 12, 1977 || Kiso || H. Kosai, K. Furukawa || V || align=right | 3.0 km || 
|-id=219 bgcolor=#fefefe
| 6219 Demalia ||  ||  || August 8, 1978 || Nauchnij || N. S. Chernykh || NYS || align=right | 2.4 km || 
|-id=220 bgcolor=#d6d6d6
| 6220 Stepanmakarov ||  ||  || September 26, 1978 || Nauchnij || L. V. Zhuravleva || EOS || align=right | 11 km || 
|-id=221 bgcolor=#d6d6d6
| 6221 Ducentesima || 1980 GO ||  || April 13, 1980 || Kleť || A. Mrkos || THM || align=right | 13 km || 
|-id=222 bgcolor=#d6d6d6
| 6222 ||  || — || August 8, 1980 || Siding Spring || Edinburgh Obs. || — || align=right | 27 km || 
|-id=223 bgcolor=#E9E9E9
| 6223 Dahl ||  ||  || September 3, 1980 || Kleť || A. Mrkos || — || align=right | 20 km || 
|-id=224 bgcolor=#fefefe
| 6224 El Goresy ||  ||  || March 1, 1981 || Siding Spring || S. J. Bus || — || align=right | 3.6 km || 
|-id=225 bgcolor=#fefefe
| 6225 Hiroko ||  ||  || March 1, 1981 || Siding Spring || S. J. Bus || — || align=right | 2.1 km || 
|-id=226 bgcolor=#fefefe
| 6226 Paulwarren ||  ||  || March 2, 1981 || Siding Spring || S. J. Bus || — || align=right | 3.2 km || 
|-id=227 bgcolor=#d6d6d6
| 6227 Alanrubin ||  ||  || March 2, 1981 || Siding Spring || S. J. Bus || THM || align=right | 11 km || 
|-id=228 bgcolor=#E9E9E9
| 6228 Yonezawa || 1982 BA ||  || January 17, 1982 || Tōkai || T. Furuta || — || align=right | 6.7 km || 
|-id=229 bgcolor=#d6d6d6
| 6229 Tursachan ||  ||  || November 4, 1983 || Anderson Mesa || B. A. Skiff || THM || align=right | 12 km || 
|-id=230 bgcolor=#E9E9E9
| 6230 Fram ||  ||  || September 27, 1984 || Kleť || Z. Vávrová || HOF || align=right | 13 km || 
|-id=231 bgcolor=#fefefe
| 6231 Hundertwasser || 1985 FH ||  || March 20, 1985 || Kleť || A. Mrkos || — || align=right | 5.5 km || 
|-id=232 bgcolor=#fefefe
| 6232 Zubitskia ||  ||  || September 19, 1985 || Nauchnij || N. S. Chernykh, L. I. Chernykh || FLO || align=right | 6.0 km || 
|-id=233 bgcolor=#E9E9E9
| 6233 Kimura || 1986 CG ||  || February 8, 1986 || Karasuyama || S. Inoda, T. Urata || DOR || align=right | 9.9 km || 
|-id=234 bgcolor=#fefefe
| 6234 Sheilawolfman || 1986 SF ||  || September 30, 1986 || Kleť || Z. Vávrová || — || align=right | 4.7 km || 
|-id=235 bgcolor=#fefefe
| 6235 Burney || 1987 VB ||  || November 14, 1987 || Kushiro || S. Ueda, H. Kaneda || — || align=right | 4.1 km || 
|-id=236 bgcolor=#d6d6d6
| 6236 Mallard || 1988 WF ||  || November 29, 1988 || Oohira || Oohira Stn. || slow || align=right | 13 km || 
|-id=237 bgcolor=#d6d6d6
| 6237 Chikushi || 1989 CV ||  || February 4, 1989 || Geisei || T. Seki || 3:2 || align=right | 37 km || 
|-id=238 bgcolor=#E9E9E9
| 6238 Septimaclark || 1989 NM ||  || July 2, 1989 || Palomar || E. F. Helin || — || align=right | 7.8 km || 
|-id=239 bgcolor=#FFC2E0
| 6239 Minos || 1989 QF ||  || August 31, 1989 || Palomar || C. S. Shoemaker, E. M. Shoemaker || APOPHA || align=right data-sort-value="0.71" | 710 m || 
|-id=240 bgcolor=#fefefe
| 6240 Lucretius Carus ||  ||  || September 26, 1989 || La Silla || E. W. Elst || FLO || align=right | 4.7 km || 
|-id=241 bgcolor=#d6d6d6
| 6241 Galante || 1989 TG ||  || October 4, 1989 || Bologna || San Vittore Obs. || EOS || align=right | 12 km || 
|-id=242 bgcolor=#fefefe
| 6242 ||  || — || July 29, 1990 || Palomar || H. E. Holt || FLO || align=right | 3.8 km || 
|-id=243 bgcolor=#fefefe
| 6243 Yoder ||  ||  || July 27, 1990 || Palomar || H. E. Holt || — || align=right | 3.9 km || 
|-id=244 bgcolor=#fefefe
| 6244 Okamoto || 1990 QF ||  || August 20, 1990 || Geisei || T. Seki || moon || align=right | 5.5 km || 
|-id=245 bgcolor=#fefefe
| 6245 Ikufumi ||  ||  || September 27, 1990 || Oohira || T. Urata || moon || align=right | 8.1 km || 
|-id=246 bgcolor=#fefefe
| 6246 Komurotoru ||  ||  || November 13, 1990 || Kitami || T. Fujii, K. Watanabe || PHO || align=right | 5.6 km || 
|-id=247 bgcolor=#fefefe
| 6247 Amanogawa ||  ||  || November 21, 1990 || Kitami || K. Endate, K. Watanabe || — || align=right | 6.7 km || 
|-id=248 bgcolor=#d6d6d6
| 6248 ||  || — || January 17, 1991 || Kleť || Z. Vávrová || THM || align=right | 11 km || 
|-id=249 bgcolor=#FA8072
| 6249 Jennifer ||  ||  || May 7, 1991 || Palomar || E. F. Helin || H || align=right | 7.2 km || 
|-id=250 bgcolor=#fefefe
| 6250 Saekohayashi ||  ||  || November 2, 1991 || Palomar || E. F. Helin || H || align=right | 3.1 km || 
|-id=251 bgcolor=#fefefe
| 6251 Setsuko || 1992 DB ||  || February 25, 1992 || Susono || M. Akiyama, T. Furuta || FLO || align=right | 5.7 km || 
|-id=252 bgcolor=#d6d6d6
| 6252 Montevideo ||  ||  || March 6, 1992 || La Silla || UESAC || KOR || align=right | 6.9 km || 
|-id=253 bgcolor=#fefefe
| 6253 || 1992 FJ || — || March 24, 1992 || Kushiro || S. Ueda, H. Kaneda || FLO || align=right | 4.1 km || 
|-id=254 bgcolor=#d6d6d6
| 6254 ||  || — || October 20, 1993 || Kushiro || S. Ueda, H. Kaneda || — || align=right | 12 km || 
|-id=255 bgcolor=#E9E9E9
| 6255 Kuma || 1994 XT ||  || December 5, 1994 || Kuma Kogen || A. Nakamura || — || align=right | 17 km || 
|-id=256 bgcolor=#fefefe
| 6256 Canova || 4063 P-L ||  || September 24, 1960 || Palomar || PLS || — || align=right | 2.3 km || 
|-id=257 bgcolor=#fefefe
| 6257 Thorvaldsen || 4098 T-1 ||  || March 26, 1971 || Palomar || PLS || V || align=right | 4.3 km || 
|-id=258 bgcolor=#fefefe
| 6258 Rodin || 3070 T-2 ||  || September 30, 1973 || Palomar || PLS || FLO || align=right | 4.0 km || 
|-id=259 bgcolor=#fefefe
| 6259 Maillol || 3236 T-2 ||  || September 30, 1973 || Palomar || PLS || — || align=right | 4.5 km || 
|-id=260 bgcolor=#E9E9E9
| 6260 Kelsey || 1949 PN ||  || August 2, 1949 || Heidelberg || K. Reinmuth || EUN || align=right | 11 km || 
|-id=261 bgcolor=#FA8072
| 6261 Chione || 1976 WC ||  || November 30, 1976 || La Silla || H.-E. Schuster || — || align=right | 4.1 km || 
|-id=262 bgcolor=#d6d6d6
| 6262 Javid || 1978 RZ ||  || September 1, 1978 || Nauchnij || N. S. Chernykh || KOR || align=right | 7.8 km || 
|-id=263 bgcolor=#FA8072
| 6263 Druckmüller || 1980 PX ||  || August 6, 1980 || Kleť || Z. Vávrová || — || align=right | 3.4 km || 
|-id=264 bgcolor=#fefefe
| 6264 || 1980 SQ || — || September 29, 1980 || Kleť || Z. Vávrová || — || align=right | 4.3 km || 
|-id=265 bgcolor=#fefefe
| 6265 ||  || — || October 11, 1985 || Palomar || T. F. Fric, R. J. Gilbrech || moon || align=right | 5.0 km || 
|-id=266 bgcolor=#fefefe
| 6266 Letzel ||  ||  || October 4, 1986 || Kleť || A. Mrkos || FLO || align=right | 4.7 km || 
|-id=267 bgcolor=#fefefe
| 6267 Rozhen ||  ||  || September 20, 1987 || Smolyan || E. W. Elst || — || align=right | 3.8 km || 
|-id=268 bgcolor=#fefefe
| 6268 Versailles ||  ||  || September 22, 1990 || La Silla || E. W. Elst || EUT || align=right | 3.1 km || 
|-id=269 bgcolor=#fefefe
| 6269 Kawasaki || 1990 UJ ||  || October 20, 1990 || Oohira || T. Urata || V || align=right | 3.6 km || 
|-id=270 bgcolor=#fefefe
| 6270 Kabukuri || 1991 BD ||  || January 18, 1991 || Karasuyama || S. Inoda, T. Urata || V || align=right | 3.4 km || 
|-id=271 bgcolor=#fefefe
| 6271 Farmer || 1991 NF ||  || July 9, 1991 || Palomar || E. F. Helin || Hslow || align=right | 5.6 km || 
|-id=272 bgcolor=#fefefe
| 6272 || 1992 EB || — || March 2, 1992 || Kushiro || S. Ueda, H. Kaneda || — || align=right | 3.7 km || 
|-id=273 bgcolor=#fefefe
| 6273 Kiruna ||  ||  || March 1, 1992 || La Silla || UESAC || — || align=right | 6.9 km || 
|-id=274 bgcolor=#fefefe
| 6274 Taizaburo || 1992 FV ||  || March 23, 1992 || Kitami || K. Endate, K. Watanabe || — || align=right | 4.9 km || 
|-id=275 bgcolor=#d6d6d6
| 6275 Kiryu || 1993 VQ ||  || November 14, 1993 || Oizumi || T. Kobayashi || — || align=right | 7.0 km || 
|-id=276 bgcolor=#d6d6d6
| 6276 Kurohone || 1994 AB ||  || January 1, 1994 || Oizumi || T. Kobayashi || KOR || align=right | 7.0 km || 
|-id=277 bgcolor=#fefefe
| 6277 Siok ||  ||  || August 24, 1949 || Flagstaff || H. L. Giclas, R. D. Schaldach || — || align=right | 3.9 km || 
|-id=278 bgcolor=#fefefe
| 6278 Ametkhan || 1971 TF ||  || October 10, 1971 || Nauchnij || B. A. Burnasheva || NYS || align=right | 8.9 km || 
|-id=279 bgcolor=#d6d6d6
| 6279 ||  || — || October 18, 1977 || Palomar || K. L. Faul || THM || align=right | 17 km || 
|-id=280 bgcolor=#fefefe
| 6280 Sicardy || 1980 RJ ||  || September 2, 1980 || Anderson Mesa || E. Bowell || FLO || align=right | 4.3 km || 
|-id=281 bgcolor=#E9E9E9
| 6281 Strnad || 1980 SD ||  || September 16, 1980 || Kleť || A. Mrkos || EUN || align=right | 8.1 km || 
|-id=282 bgcolor=#fefefe
| 6282 Edwelda ||  ||  || October 9, 1980 || Palomar || C. S. Shoemaker || — || align=right | 5.4 km || 
|-id=283 bgcolor=#E9E9E9
| 6283 ||  || — || November 6, 1980 || Nanking || Purple Mountain Obs. || DOR || align=right | 11 km || 
|-id=284 bgcolor=#d6d6d6
| 6284 Borisivanov ||  ||  || March 2, 1981 || Siding Spring || S. J. Bus || — || align=right | 7.3 km || 
|-id=285 bgcolor=#E9E9E9
| 6285 Ingram ||  ||  || March 2, 1981 || Siding Spring || S. J. Bus || — || align=right | 4.4 km || 
|-id=286 bgcolor=#fefefe
| 6286 || 1983 EU || — || March 10, 1983 || Anderson Mesa || E. Barr || FLO || align=right | 4.6 km || 
|-id=287 bgcolor=#d6d6d6
| 6287 Lenham || 1984 AR ||  || January 8, 1984 || Anderson Mesa || E. Bowell || THM || align=right | 11 km || 
|-id=288 bgcolor=#d6d6d6
| 6288 Fouts ||  ||  || March 2, 1984 || La Silla || H. Debehogne || THM || align=right | 13 km || 
|-id=289 bgcolor=#d6d6d6
| 6289 Lanusei ||  ||  || April 28, 1984 || La Silla || W. Ferreri, V. Zappalà || THM || align=right | 12 km || 
|-id=290 bgcolor=#fefefe
| 6290 ||  || — || February 12, 1985 || La Silla || H. Debehogne || FLO || align=right | 5.4 km || 
|-id=291 bgcolor=#fefefe
| 6291 Renzetti ||  ||  || October 15, 1985 || Anderson Mesa || E. Bowell || — || align=right | 4.9 km || 
|-id=292 bgcolor=#fefefe
| 6292 ||  || — || August 28, 1986 || La Silla || H. Debehogne || V || align=right | 3.9 km || 
|-id=293 bgcolor=#fefefe
| 6293 Oberpfalz ||  ||  || November 26, 1987 || Tautenburg Observatory || F. Börngen || — || align=right | 2.6 km || 
|-id=294 bgcolor=#fefefe
| 6294 Czerny ||  ||  || February 11, 1988 || La Silla || E. W. Elst || — || align=right | 4.1 km || 
|-id=295 bgcolor=#fefefe
| 6295 Schmoll ||  ||  || February 11, 1988 || La Silla || E. W. Elst || — || align=right | 9.1 km || 
|-id=296 bgcolor=#fefefe
| 6296 Cleveland || 1988 NC ||  || July 12, 1988 || Palomar || E. F. Helin || H || align=right | 3.2 km || 
|-id=297 bgcolor=#d6d6d6
| 6297 ||  || — || November 2, 1988 || Kushiro || S. Ueda, H. Kaneda || THM || align=right | 16 km || 
|-id=298 bgcolor=#d6d6d6
| 6298 Sawaoka || 1988 XC ||  || December 1, 1988 || Chiyoda || T. Kojima || — || align=right | 7.4 km || 
|-id=299 bgcolor=#d6d6d6
| 6299 Reizoutoyoko ||  ||  || December 5, 1988 || Yorii || M. Arai, H. Mori || KOR || align=right | 9.0 km || 
|-id=300 bgcolor=#d6d6d6
| 6300 Hosamu || 1988 YB ||  || December 30, 1988 || Okutama || T. Hioki, N. Kawasato || THM || align=right | 13 km || 
|}

6301–6400 

|-bgcolor=#d6d6d6
| 6301 Bohumilruprecht ||  ||  || January 29, 1989 || Kleť || Z. Vávrová || THM || align=right | 18 km || 
|-id=302 bgcolor=#E9E9E9
| 6302 Tengukogen || 1989 CF ||  || February 2, 1989 || Geisei || T. Seki || EUN || align=right | 5.3 km || 
|-id=303 bgcolor=#fefefe
| 6303 ||  || — || March 12, 1989 || Kushiro || S. Ueda, H. Kaneda || FLO || align=right | 3.6 km || 
|-id=304 bgcolor=#fefefe
| 6304 Josephus Flavius ||  ||  || April 2, 1989 || La Silla || E. W. Elst || — || align=right | 4.2 km || 
|-id=305 bgcolor=#fefefe
| 6305 Helgoland ||  ||  || April 6, 1989 || Tautenburg Observatory || F. Börngen || FLO || align=right | 3.2 km || 
|-id=306 bgcolor=#E9E9E9
| 6306 Nishimura ||  ||  || October 30, 1989 || Dynic || A. Sugie || MIT || align=right | 16 km || 
|-id=307 bgcolor=#E9E9E9
| 6307 Maiztegui ||  ||  || November 22, 1989 || El Leoncito || Félix Aguilar Obs. || MAR || align=right | 9.5 km || 
|-id=308 bgcolor=#d6d6d6
| 6308 Ebisuzaki || 1990 BK ||  || January 17, 1990 || Yatsugatake || Y. Kushida, O. Muramatsu || THM || align=right | 12 km || 
|-id=309 bgcolor=#d6d6d6
| 6309 Elsschot ||  ||  || March 2, 1990 || La Silla || E. W. Elst || EOS || align=right | 11 km || 
|-id=310 bgcolor=#fefefe
| 6310 Jankonke || 1990 KK ||  || May 21, 1990 || Palomar || E. F. Helin || H || align=right | 3.7 km || 
|-id=311 bgcolor=#fefefe
| 6311 Porubčan ||  ||  || September 15, 1990 || Palomar || H. E. Holt || — || align=right | 4.9 km || 
|-id=312 bgcolor=#fefefe
| 6312 Robheinlein ||  ||  || September 14, 1990 || Palomar || H. E. Holt || — || align=right | 3.6 km || 
|-id=313 bgcolor=#fefefe
| 6313 Tsurutani ||  ||  || September 14, 1990 || La Silla || H. Debehogne || — || align=right | 2.9 km || 
|-id=314 bgcolor=#fefefe
| 6314 Reigber ||  ||  || September 17, 1990 || Palomar || H. E. Holt || FLO || align=right | 5.1 km || 
|-id=315 bgcolor=#fefefe
| 6315 Barabash || 1990 TS ||  || October 11, 1990 || Kushiro || S. Ueda, H. Kaneda || — || align=right | 3.6 km || 
|-id=316 bgcolor=#fefefe
| 6316 Méndez ||  ||  || October 9, 1990 || Siding Spring || R. H. McNaught || FLO || align=right | 2.9 km || 
|-id=317 bgcolor=#fefefe
| 6317 Dreyfus ||  ||  || October 16, 1990 || La Silla || E. W. Elst || — || align=right | 5.6 km || 
|-id=318 bgcolor=#FA8072
| 6318 Cronkite || 1990 WA ||  || November 18, 1990 || Palomar || E. F. Helin || — || align=right | 1.4 km || 
|-id=319 bgcolor=#fefefe
| 6319 Beregovoj ||  ||  || November 19, 1990 || La Silla || E. W. Elst || FLO || align=right | 4.6 km || 
|-id=320 bgcolor=#fefefe
| 6320 Bremen ||  ||  || January 15, 1991 || Tautenburg Observatory || F. Börngen || NYS || align=right | 10 km || 
|-id=321 bgcolor=#E9E9E9
| 6321 Namuratakao || 1991 BV ||  || January 19, 1991 || Dynic || A. Sugie || EUN || align=right | 7.7 km || 
|-id=322 bgcolor=#FA8072
| 6322 || 1991 CQ || — || February 10, 1991 || Siding Spring || R. H. McNaught || — || align=right | 1.6 km || 
|-id=323 bgcolor=#E9E9E9
| 6323 Karoji ||  ||  || February 14, 1991 || Kitami || K. Endate, K. Watanabe || — || align=right | 5.5 km || 
|-id=324 bgcolor=#E9E9E9
| 6324 Kejonuma ||  ||  || February 23, 1991 || Karasuyama || S. Inoda, T. Urata || — || align=right | 6.0 km || 
|-id=325 bgcolor=#E9E9E9
| 6325 ||  || — || March 14, 1991 || Yorii || M. Arai, H. Mori || CLO || align=right | 12 km || 
|-id=326 bgcolor=#E9E9E9
| 6326 Idamiyoshi ||  ||  || March 18, 1991 || Dynic || A. Sugie || EUN || align=right | 6.9 km || 
|-id=327 bgcolor=#E9E9E9
| 6327 Tijn ||  ||  || April 9, 1991 || Palomar || E. F. Helin || — || align=right | 11 km || 
|-id=328 bgcolor=#d6d6d6
| 6328 ||  || — || July 12, 1991 || Palomar || H. E. Holt || — || align=right | 16 km || 
|-id=329 bgcolor=#fefefe
| 6329 Hikonejyo ||  ||  || March 12, 1992 || Dynic || A. Sugie || — || align=right | 5.6 km || 
|-id=330 bgcolor=#fefefe
| 6330 Koen || 1992 FN ||  || March 23, 1992 || Kitami || K. Endate, K. Watanabe || — || align=right | 3.2 km || 
|-id=331 bgcolor=#fefefe
| 6331 ||  || — || March 28, 1992 || Kushiro || S. Ueda, H. Kaneda || V || align=right | 5.3 km || 
|-id=332 bgcolor=#fefefe
| 6332 Vorarlberg ||  ||  || March 30, 1992 || Tautenburg Observatory || F. Börngen || — || align=right | 12 km || 
|-id=333 bgcolor=#fefefe
| 6333 Helenejacq || 1992 LG ||  || June 3, 1992 || Palomar || G. J. Leonard || — || align=right | 4.5 km || 
|-id=334 bgcolor=#fefefe
| 6334 Robleonard || 1992 MM ||  || June 27, 1992 || Palomar || G. J. Leonard || — || align=right | 5.0 km || 
|-id=335 bgcolor=#E9E9E9
| 6335 Nicolerappaport || 1992 NR ||  || July 5, 1992 || Palomar || E. F. Helin, J. Alu || EUN || align=right | 6.1 km || 
|-id=336 bgcolor=#fefefe
| 6336 Dodo || 1992 UU ||  || October 21, 1992 || Kiyosato || S. Otomo || — || align=right | 8.7 km || 
|-id=337 bgcolor=#d6d6d6
| 6337 Shiota ||  ||  || October 26, 1992 || Kitami || K. Endate, K. Watanabe || — || align=right | 14 km || 
|-id=338 bgcolor=#d6d6d6
| 6338 Isaosato ||  ||  || October 26, 1992 || Kitami || K. Endate, K. Watanabe || — || align=right | 23 km || 
|-id=339 bgcolor=#fefefe
| 6339 Giliberti || 1993 SG ||  || September 20, 1993 || Colleverde || V. S. Casulli || — || align=right | 4.5 km || 
|-id=340 bgcolor=#d6d6d6
| 6340 Kathmandu ||  ||  || October 15, 1993 || Kitami || K. Endate, K. Watanabe || — || align=right | 19 km || 
|-id=341 bgcolor=#d6d6d6
| 6341 ||  || — || October 20, 1993 || Kushiro || S. Ueda, H. Kaneda || EOS || align=right | 14 km || 
|-id=342 bgcolor=#d6d6d6
| 6342 || 1993 VG || — || November 7, 1993 || Kushiro || S. Ueda, H. Kaneda || KOR || align=right | 5.3 km || 
|-id=343 bgcolor=#d6d6d6
| 6343 || 1993 VK || — || November 7, 1993 || Kushiro || S. Ueda, H. Kaneda || VER || align=right | 21 km || 
|-id=344 bgcolor=#fefefe
| 6344 || 1993 VM || — || November 7, 1993 || Kushiro || S. Ueda, H. Kaneda || FLO || align=right | 4.3 km || 
|-id=345 bgcolor=#d6d6d6
| 6345 Hideo ||  ||  || January 5, 1994 || Kitami || K. Endate, K. Watanabe || — || align=right | 14 km || 
|-id=346 bgcolor=#d6d6d6
| 6346 Syukumeguri || 1995 AY ||  || January 6, 1995 || Oizumi || T. Kobayashi || — || align=right | 19 km || 
|-id=347 bgcolor=#fefefe
| 6347 ||  || — || January 28, 1995 || Kushiro || S. Ueda, H. Kaneda || — || align=right | 5.6 km || 
|-id=348 bgcolor=#fefefe
| 6348 ||  || — || February 3, 1995 || Kushiro || S. Ueda, H. Kaneda || — || align=right | 4.7 km || 
|-id=349 bgcolor=#E9E9E9
| 6349 Acapulco ||  ||  || February 8, 1995 || Ayashi Station || M. Koishikawa || ADE || align=right | 20 km || 
|-id=350 bgcolor=#d6d6d6
| 6350 Schlüter || 3526 P-L ||  || October 17, 1960 || Palomar || PLS || — || align=right | 22 km || 
|-id=351 bgcolor=#d6d6d6
| 6351 Neumann || 4277 T-1 ||  || March 26, 1971 || Palomar || PLS || — || align=right | 17 km || 
|-id=352 bgcolor=#fefefe
| 6352 Schlaun || 2400 T-3 ||  || October 16, 1977 || Palomar || PLS || — || align=right | 4.3 km || 
|-id=353 bgcolor=#d6d6d6
| 6353 Semper || 3107 T-3 ||  || October 16, 1977 || Palomar || PLS || — || align=right | 15 km || 
|-id=354 bgcolor=#E9E9E9
| 6354 Vangelis || 1934 GA ||  || April 3, 1934 || Uccle || E. Delporte || — || align=right | 7.6 km || 
|-id=355 bgcolor=#d6d6d6
| 6355 Univermoscow ||  ||  || October 15, 1969 || Nauchnij || L. I. Chernykh || ALA || align=right | 28 km || 
|-id=356 bgcolor=#E9E9E9
| 6356 Tairov || 1976 QR ||  || August 26, 1976 || Nauchnij || N. S. Chernykh || — || align=right | 8.5 km || 
|-id=357 bgcolor=#d6d6d6
| 6357 Glushko ||  ||  || September 24, 1976 || Nauchnij || N. S. Chernykh || EOS || align=right | 11 km || 
|-id=358 bgcolor=#E9E9E9
| 6358 Chertok ||  ||  || January 13, 1977 || Nauchnij || N. S. Chernykh || — || align=right | 14 km || 
|-id=359 bgcolor=#d6d6d6
| 6359 Dubinin ||  ||  || January 13, 1977 || Nauchnij || N. S. Chernykh || — || align=right | 32 km || 
|-id=360 bgcolor=#fefefe
| 6360 ||  || — || October 27, 1978 || Palomar || C. M. Olmstead || — || align=right | 5.8 km || 
|-id=361 bgcolor=#fefefe
| 6361 Koppel ||  ||  || November 7, 1978 || Palomar || E. F. Helin, S. J. Bus || — || align=right | 3.6 km || 
|-id=362 bgcolor=#d6d6d6
| 6362 Tunis || 1979 KO ||  || May 19, 1979 || La Silla || R. M. West || — || align=right | 23 km || 
|-id=363 bgcolor=#fefefe
| 6363 Doggett ||  ||  || February 6, 1981 || Anderson Mesa || E. Bowell || — || align=right | 5.1 km || 
|-id=364 bgcolor=#E9E9E9
| 6364 Casarini || 1981 ET ||  || March 5, 1981 || La Silla || H. Debehogne, G. DeSanctis || — || align=right | 11 km || 
|-id=365 bgcolor=#d6d6d6
| 6365 Nickschneider ||  ||  || March 1, 1981 || Siding Spring || S. J. Bus || — || align=right | 12 km || 
|-id=366 bgcolor=#d6d6d6
| 6366 Rainerwieler ||  ||  || October 24, 1981 || Palomar || S. J. Bus || — || align=right | 15 km || 
|-id=367 bgcolor=#fefefe
| 6367 ||  || — || March 18, 1982 || La Silla || H. Debehogne || — || align=right | 4.3 km || 
|-id=368 bgcolor=#fefefe
| 6368 Richardmenendez ||  ||  || September 1, 1983 || La Silla || H. Debehogne || — || align=right | 4.4 km || 
|-id=369 bgcolor=#fefefe
| 6369 || 1983 UC || — || October 16, 1983 || Kleť || Z. Vávrová || FLOmoon || align=right | 3.3 km || 
|-id=370 bgcolor=#fefefe
| 6370 Malpais || 1984 EY ||  || March 9, 1984 || Anderson Mesa || B. A. Skiff || V || align=right | 4.8 km || 
|-id=371 bgcolor=#d6d6d6
| 6371 Heinlein || 1985 GS ||  || April 15, 1985 || Anderson Mesa || E. Bowell || — || align=right | 21 km || 
|-id=372 bgcolor=#d6d6d6
| 6372 Walker ||  ||  || May 13, 1985 || Palomar || C. S. Shoemaker, E. M. Shoemaker || MEL || align=right | 42 km || 
|-id=373 bgcolor=#E9E9E9
| 6373 Stern || 1986 EZ ||  || March 5, 1986 || Anderson Mesa || E. Bowell || EUN || align=right | 9.3 km || 
|-id=374 bgcolor=#d6d6d6
| 6374 Beslan ||  ||  || August 8, 1986 || Nauchnij || L. I. Chernykh || VER || align=right | 16 km || 
|-id=375 bgcolor=#d6d6d6
| 6375 Fredharris ||  ||  || October 1, 1986 || Caussols || CERGA || THM || align=right | 15 km || 
|-id=376 bgcolor=#E9E9E9
| 6376 Schamp ||  ||  || May 29, 1987 || Palomar || C. S. Shoemaker, E. M. Shoemaker || — || align=right | 7.9 km || 
|-id=377 bgcolor=#E9E9E9
| 6377 Cagney ||  ||  || June 25, 1987 || Kleť || A. Mrkos || — || align=right | 12 km || 
|-id=378 bgcolor=#d6d6d6
| 6378 ||  || — || September 27, 1987 || La Silla || H. Debehogne || THM || align=right | 13 km || 
|-id=379 bgcolor=#d6d6d6
| 6379 Vrba ||  ||  || November 15, 1987 || Kleť || A. Mrkos || — || align=right | 15 km || 
|-id=380 bgcolor=#fefefe
| 6380 Gardel || 1988 CG ||  || February 10, 1988 || Yorii || M. Arai, H. Mori || — || align=right | 3.0 km || 
|-id=381 bgcolor=#fefefe
| 6381 Toyama ||  ||  || February 21, 1988 || Kitami || T. Fujii, K. Watanabe || FLO || align=right | 5.0 km || 
|-id=382 bgcolor=#fefefe
| 6382 || 1988 EL || — || March 14, 1988 || Palomar || J. Alu || H || align=right | 4.9 km || 
|-id=383 bgcolor=#d6d6d6
| 6383 Tokushima ||  ||  || December 12, 1988 || Tokushima || M. Iwamoto, T. Furuta || EOS || align=right | 15 km || 
|-id=384 bgcolor=#fefefe
| 6384 Kervin || 1989 AM ||  || January 3, 1989 || Palomar || E. F. Helin || Hmoon || align=right | 3.7 km || 
|-id=385 bgcolor=#d6d6d6
| 6385 Martindavid ||  ||  || March 5, 1989 || Kleť || A. Mrkos || HYG || align=right | 13 km || 
|-id=386 bgcolor=#FA8072
| 6386 Keithnoll ||  ||  || July 10, 1989 || Palomar || H. E. Holt || — || align=right | 8.5 km || 
|-id=387 bgcolor=#E9E9E9
| 6387 || 1989 WC || — || November 19, 1989 || Kushiro || S. Ueda, H. Kaneda || — || align=right | 5.3 km || 
|-id=388 bgcolor=#E9E9E9
| 6388 ||  || — || November 25, 1989 || Kushiro || S. Ueda, H. Kaneda || EUN || align=right | 7.6 km || 
|-id=389 bgcolor=#E9E9E9
| 6389 Ogawa || 1990 BX ||  || January 21, 1990 || Kitami || K. Endate, K. Watanabe || — || align=right | 6.3 km || 
|-id=390 bgcolor=#d6d6d6
| 6390 Hirabayashi ||  ||  || January 26, 1990 || Kitami || K. Endate, K. Watanabe || — || align=right | 15 km || 
|-id=391 bgcolor=#E9E9E9
| 6391 Africano ||  ||  || January 21, 1990 || Palomar || E. F. Helin || EUN || align=right | 5.9 km || 
|-id=392 bgcolor=#d6d6d6
| 6392 Takashimizuno || 1990 HR ||  || April 29, 1990 || Kani || Y. Mizuno, T. Furuta || — || align=right | 25 km || 
|-id=393 bgcolor=#d6d6d6
| 6393 ||  || — || April 29, 1990 || Fujieda || H. Shiozawa, M. Kizawa || — || align=right | 20 km || 
|-id=394 bgcolor=#fefefe
| 6394 ||  || — || August 22, 1990 || Palomar || H. E. Holt || H || align=right | 3.2 km || 
|-id=395 bgcolor=#fefefe
| 6395 Hilliard ||  ||  || October 21, 1990 || Yatsugatake || Y. Kushida, O. Muramatsu || NYS || align=right | 4.1 km || 
|-id=396 bgcolor=#fefefe
| 6396 Schleswig ||  ||  || January 15, 1991 || Tautenburg Observatory || F. Börngen || — || align=right | 3.6 km || 
|-id=397 bgcolor=#fefefe
| 6397 || 1991 BJ || — || January 17, 1991 || Okutama || T. Hioki, S. Hayakawa || — || align=right | 6.2 km || 
|-id=398 bgcolor=#fefefe
| 6398 Timhunter ||  ||  || February 10, 1991 || Palomar || C. S. Shoemaker, E. M. Shoemaker, D. H. Levy || PHO || align=right | 5.5 km || 
|-id=399 bgcolor=#fefefe
| 6399 Harada || 1991 GA ||  || April 3, 1991 || Geisei || T. Seki || — || align=right | 5.8 km || 
|-id=400 bgcolor=#d6d6d6
| 6400 Georgealexander ||  ||  || April 10, 1991 || Palomar || E. F. Helin || — || align=right | 12 km || 
|}

6401–6500 

|-bgcolor=#E9E9E9
| 6401 Roentgen ||  ||  || April 15, 1991 || Palomar || C. S. Shoemaker, E. M. Shoemaker, D. H. Levy || EUN || align=right | 7.9 km || 
|-id=402 bgcolor=#E9E9E9
| 6402 Holstein ||  ||  || April 9, 1991 || Tautenburg Observatory || F. Börngen || — || align=right | 8.6 km || 
|-id=403 bgcolor=#E9E9E9
| 6403 Steverin || 1991 NU ||  || July 8, 1991 || Palomar || E. F. Helin || MAR || align=right | 6.9 km || 
|-id=404 bgcolor=#d6d6d6
| 6404 Vanavara ||  ||  || August 6, 1991 || La Silla || E. W. Elst || — || align=right | 17 km || 
|-id=405 bgcolor=#fefefe
| 6405 Komiyama || 1992 HJ ||  || April 30, 1992 || Yatsugatake || Y. Kushida, O. Muramatsu || FLO || align=right | 6.5 km || 
|-id=406 bgcolor=#fefefe
| 6406 Mikejura || 1992 MJ ||  || June 28, 1992 || Palomar || H. E. Holt || — || align=right | 4.1 km || 
|-id=407 bgcolor=#fefefe
| 6407 ||  || — || August 2, 1992 || Palomar || H. E. Holt || FLO || align=right | 4.4 km || 
|-id=408 bgcolor=#d6d6d6
| 6408 Saijo ||  ||  || October 28, 1992 || Kitami || K. Endate, K. Watanabe || KOR || align=right | 11 km || 
|-id=409 bgcolor=#E9E9E9
| 6409 || 1992 VC || — || November 2, 1992 || Uenohara || N. Kawasato || EUN || align=right | 7.3 km || 
|-id=410 bgcolor=#E9E9E9
| 6410 Fujiwara ||  ||  || November 29, 1992 || Kiyosato || S. Otomo || DOR || align=right | 15 km || 
|-id=411 bgcolor=#FA8072
| 6411 Tamaga || 1993 TA ||  || October 8, 1993 || Siding Spring || R. H. McNaught || — || align=right | 13 km || 
|-id=412 bgcolor=#fefefe
| 6412 Kaifu ||  ||  || October 15, 1993 || Kitami || K. Endate, K. Watanabe || V || align=right | 4.2 km || 
|-id=413 bgcolor=#fefefe
| 6413 Iye ||  ||  || October 15, 1993 || Kitami || K. Endate, K. Watanabe || FLO || align=right | 5.3 km || 
|-id=414 bgcolor=#fefefe
| 6414 Mizunuma || 1993 UX ||  || October 24, 1993 || Oizumi || T. Kobayashi || — || align=right | 4.4 km || 
|-id=415 bgcolor=#d6d6d6
| 6415 ||  || — || November 11, 1993 || Kushiro || S. Ueda, H. Kaneda || HYG || align=right | 16 km || 
|-id=416 bgcolor=#d6d6d6
| 6416 Nyukasayama ||  ||  || November 14, 1993 || Nyukasa || M. Hirasawa, S. Suzuki || — || align=right | 12 km || 
|-id=417 bgcolor=#E9E9E9
| 6417 Liberati || 1993 XA ||  || December 4, 1993 || Stroncone || A. Vagnozzi || — || align=right | 4.8 km || 
|-id=418 bgcolor=#fefefe
| 6418 Hanamigahara || 1993 XJ ||  || December 8, 1993 || Oizumi || T. Kobayashi || V || align=right | 6.4 km || 
|-id=419 bgcolor=#d6d6d6
| 6419 Susono || 1993 XX ||  || December 7, 1993 || Susono || M. Akiyama, T. Furuta || — || align=right | 17 km || 
|-id=420 bgcolor=#d6d6d6
| 6420 Riheijyaya ||  ||  || December 14, 1993 || Oizumi || T. Kobayashi || EOS || align=right | 13 km || 
|-id=421 bgcolor=#fefefe
| 6421 ||  || — || December 6, 1993 || Kushiro || S. Ueda, H. Kaneda || V || align=right | 4.5 km || 
|-id=422 bgcolor=#E9E9E9
| 6422 Akagi ||  ||  || February 7, 1994 || Oizumi || T. Kobayashi || EUN || align=right | 9.1 km || 
|-id=423 bgcolor=#d6d6d6
| 6423 Harunasan ||  ||  || February 13, 1994 || Oizumi || T. Kobayashi || — || align=right | 11 km || 
|-id=424 bgcolor=#d6d6d6
| 6424 Ando ||  ||  || March 14, 1994 || Kitami || K. Endate, K. Watanabe || EOS || align=right | 11 km || 
|-id=425 bgcolor=#E9E9E9
| 6425 ||  || — || November 28, 1994 || Kushiro || S. Ueda, H. Kaneda || slow || align=right | 11 km || 
|-id=426 bgcolor=#fefefe
| 6426 Vanýsek || 1995 ED ||  || March 2, 1995 || Kleť || M. Tichý || NYS || align=right | 4.7 km || 
|-id=427 bgcolor=#fefefe
| 6427 || 1995 FY || — || March 28, 1995 || Kushiro || S. Ueda, H. Kaneda || — || align=right | 5.5 km || 
|-id=428 bgcolor=#E9E9E9
| 6428 Barlach || 3513 P-L ||  || October 17, 1960 || Palomar || PLS || — || align=right | 5.2 km || 
|-id=429 bgcolor=#fefefe
| 6429 Brancusi || 4050 T-1 ||  || March 26, 1971 || Palomar || PLS || — || align=right | 3.3 km || 
|-id=430 bgcolor=#fefefe
| 6430 || 1964 UP || — || October 30, 1964 || Nanking || Purple Mountain Obs. || — || align=right | 5.2 km || 
|-id=431 bgcolor=#fefefe
| 6431 || 1967 UT || — || October 30, 1967 || Hamburg-Bergedorf || L. Kohoutek || — || align=right | 5.2 km || 
|-id=432 bgcolor=#d6d6d6
| 6432 Temirkanov ||  ||  || October 3, 1975 || Nauchnij || L. I. Chernykh || — || align=right | 21 km || 
|-id=433 bgcolor=#fefefe
| 6433 Enya || 1978 WC ||  || November 18, 1978 || Kleť || A. Mrkos || — || align=right | 7.4 km || 
|-id=434 bgcolor=#fefefe
| 6434 Jewitt || 1981 OH ||  || July 26, 1981 || Anderson Mesa || E. Bowell || — || align=right | 4.6 km || 
|-id=435 bgcolor=#fefefe
| 6435 Daveross || 1984 DA ||  || February 24, 1984 || Palomar || E. F. Helin, R. S. Dunbar || H || align=right | 2.0 km || 
|-id=436 bgcolor=#fefefe
| 6436 Coco ||  ||  || May 13, 1985 || Palomar || C. S. Shoemaker, E. M. Shoemaker || — || align=right | 4.0 km || 
|-id=437 bgcolor=#d6d6d6
| 6437 Stroganov ||  ||  || August 28, 1987 || La Silla || E. W. Elst || KOR || align=right | 7.6 km || 
|-id=438 bgcolor=#fefefe
| 6438 Suárez ||  ||  || January 18, 1988 || La Silla || H. Debehogne || — || align=right | 3.0 km || 
|-id=439 bgcolor=#d6d6d6
| 6439 Tirol || 1988 CV ||  || February 13, 1988 || Tautenburg Observatory || F. Börngen || — || align=right | 17 km || 
|-id=440 bgcolor=#fefefe
| 6440 Ransome ||  ||  || September 8, 1988 || Kleť || A. Mrkos || NYS || align=right | 4.6 km || 
|-id=441 bgcolor=#fefefe
| 6441 Milenajesenská ||  ||  || September 9, 1988 || Kleť || A. Mrkos || NYS || align=right | 4.8 km || 
|-id=442 bgcolor=#E9E9E9
| 6442 Salzburg ||  ||  || September 8, 1988 || Tautenburg Observatory || F. Börngen || — || align=right | 7.4 km || 
|-id=443 bgcolor=#C2FFFF
| 6443 Harpalion ||  ||  || September 14, 1988 || Cerro Tololo || S. J. Bus || L5 || align=right | 21 km || 
|-id=444 bgcolor=#FA8072
| 6444 Ryuzin || 1989 WW ||  || November 20, 1989 || Toyota || K. Suzuki, T. Urata || — || align=right | 4.2 km || 
|-id=445 bgcolor=#E9E9E9
| 6445 Bellmore ||  ||  || March 23, 1990 || Palomar || E. F. Helin || EUN || align=right | 7.3 km || 
|-id=446 bgcolor=#FA8072
| 6446 Lomberg || 1990 QL ||  || August 18, 1990 || Palomar || E. F. Helin || PHO || align=right | 2.0 km || 
|-id=447 bgcolor=#fefefe
| 6447 Terrycole ||  ||  || October 14, 1990 || Palomar || E. F. Helin || H || align=right | 2.7 km || 
|-id=448 bgcolor=#fefefe
| 6448 || 1991 CW || — || February 8, 1991 || Toyota || K. Suzuki, T. Urata || — || align=right | 4.1 km || 
|-id=449 bgcolor=#fefefe
| 6449 Kudara ||  ||  || February 7, 1991 || Geisei || T. Seki || — || align=right | 3.7 km || 
|-id=450 bgcolor=#E9E9E9
| 6450 Masahikohayashi ||  ||  || April 9, 1991 || Palomar || E. F. Helin || — || align=right | 6.0 km || 
|-id=451 bgcolor=#E9E9E9
| 6451 Kärnten ||  ||  || April 9, 1991 || Tautenburg Observatory || F. Börngen || — || align=right | 5.6 km || 
|-id=452 bgcolor=#fefefe
| 6452 Johneuller || 1991 HA ||  || April 17, 1991 || Foggy Bottom || T. J. Balonek || — || align=right | 7.8 km || 
|-id=453 bgcolor=#E9E9E9
| 6453 || 1991 NY || — || July 13, 1991 || Palomar || H. E. Holt || — || align=right | 8.5 km || 
|-id=454 bgcolor=#E9E9E9
| 6454 ||  || — || October 29, 1991 || Siding Spring || R. H. McNaught || — || align=right | 9.5 km || 
|-id=455 bgcolor=#FFC2E0
| 6455 || 1992 HE || — || April 25, 1992 || Siding Spring || R. H. McNaught || APO +1km || align=right | 4.6 km || 
|-id=456 bgcolor=#FFC2E0
| 6456 Golombek || 1992 OM ||  || July 27, 1992 || Palomar || E. F. Helin, K. J. Lawrence || AMO +1km || align=right | 2.3 km || 
|-id=457 bgcolor=#d6d6d6
| 6457 Kremsmünster || 1992 RT ||  || September 2, 1992 || Tautenburg Observatory || L. D. Schmadel, F. Börngen || KOR || align=right | 7.0 km || 
|-id=458 bgcolor=#E9E9E9
| 6458 Nouda ||  ||  || October 2, 1992 || Geisei || T. Seki || MAR || align=right | 7.5 km || 
|-id=459 bgcolor=#d6d6d6
| 6459 Hidesan ||  ||  || October 28, 1992 || Kitami || K. Endate, K. Watanabe || EOS || align=right | 11 km || 
|-id=460 bgcolor=#fefefe
| 6460 Bassano ||  ||  || October 26, 1992 || Bassano Bresciano || U. Quadri, L. Strabla || — || align=right | 4.3 km || 
|-id=461 bgcolor=#fefefe
| 6461 Adam ||  ||  || November 4, 1993 || Siding Spring || R. H. McNaught || H || align=right | 2.6 km || 
|-id=462 bgcolor=#d6d6d6
| 6462 Myougi ||  ||  || January 9, 1994 || Oizumi || T. Kobayashi || — || align=right | 21 km || 
|-id=463 bgcolor=#E9E9E9
| 6463 Isoda ||  ||  || January 13, 1994 || Kitami || K. Endate, K. Watanabe || EUN || align=right | 11 km || 
|-id=464 bgcolor=#d6d6d6
| 6464 Kaburaki || 1994 CK ||  || February 1, 1994 || Yatsugatake || Y. Kushida, O. Muramatsu || EOS || align=right | 13 km || 
|-id=465 bgcolor=#E9E9E9
| 6465 Zvezdotchet || 1995 EP ||  || March 3, 1995 || Zelenchukskaya || T. V. Kryachko || ADE || align=right | 15 km || 
|-id=466 bgcolor=#E9E9E9
| 6466 Drewesquivel ||  ||  || June 25, 1979 || Siding Spring || E. F. Helin, S. J. Bus || EUN || align=right | 5.4 km || 
|-id=467 bgcolor=#E9E9E9
| 6467 Prilepina ||  ||  || October 14, 1979 || Nauchnij || N. S. Chernykh || — || align=right | 17 km || 
|-id=468 bgcolor=#E9E9E9
| 6468 Welzenbach ||  ||  || March 2, 1981 || Siding Spring || S. J. Bus || HEN || align=right | 6.7 km || 
|-id=469 bgcolor=#fefefe
| 6469 Armstrong || 1982 PC ||  || August 14, 1982 || Kleť || A. Mrkos || — || align=right | 3.7 km || 
|-id=470 bgcolor=#fefefe
| 6470 Aldrin ||  ||  || September 14, 1982 || Kleť || A. Mrkos || FLO || align=right | 3.2 km || 
|-id=471 bgcolor=#fefefe
| 6471 Collins ||  ||  || March 4, 1983 || Kleť || A. Mrkos || NYS || align=right | 9.0 km || 
|-id=472 bgcolor=#d6d6d6
| 6472 Rosema || 1985 TL ||  || October 15, 1985 || Anderson Mesa || E. Bowell || HYG || align=right | 13 km || 
|-id=473 bgcolor=#E9E9E9
| 6473 Winkler || 1986 GM ||  || April 9, 1986 || Anderson Mesa || E. Bowell || — || align=right | 12 km || 
|-id=474 bgcolor=#E9E9E9
| 6474 Choate ||  ||  || September 21, 1987 || Anderson Mesa || E. Bowell || MIT || align=right | 8.7 km || 
|-id=475 bgcolor=#d6d6d6
| 6475 Refugium ||  ||  || September 29, 1987 || Zimmerwald || P. Wild || — || align=right | 30 km || 
|-id=476 bgcolor=#E9E9E9
| 6476 || 1987 VT || — || November 15, 1987 || Kleť || Z. Vávrová || WAT || align=right | 14 km || 
|-id=477 bgcolor=#d6d6d6
| 6477 ||  || — || January 14, 1988 || La Silla || H. Debehogne || EOS || align=right | 11 km || 
|-id=478 bgcolor=#fefefe
| 6478 Gault ||  ||  || May 12, 1988 || Palomar || C. S. Shoemaker, E. M. Shoemaker || PHO || align=right | 3.7 km || 
|-id=479 bgcolor=#E9E9E9
| 6479 Leoconnolly || 1988 LC ||  || June 15, 1988 || Palomar || E. F. Helin || — || align=right | 15 km || 
|-id=480 bgcolor=#fefefe
| 6480 Scarlatti ||  ||  || August 12, 1988 || Haute-Provence || E. W. Elst || NYS || align=right | 3.6 km || 
|-id=481 bgcolor=#fefefe
| 6481 Tenzing ||  ||  || September 9, 1988 || Kleť || A. Mrkos || FLO || align=right | 4.5 km || 
|-id=482 bgcolor=#d6d6d6
| 6482 Steiermark ||  ||  || January 10, 1989 || Tautenburg Observatory || F. Börngen || THM || align=right | 9.9 km || 
|-id=483 bgcolor=#E9E9E9
| 6483 Nikolajvasilʹev ||  ||  || March 2, 1990 || La Silla || E. W. Elst || — || align=right | 4.5 km || 
|-id=484 bgcolor=#E9E9E9
| 6484 Barthibbs ||  ||  || March 23, 1990 || Palomar || E. F. Helin || — || align=right | 7.6 km || 
|-id=485 bgcolor=#FA8072
| 6485 Wendeesther ||  ||  || October 25, 1990 || Palomar || C. S. Shoemaker, E. M. Shoemaker, D. H. Levy || H || align=right | 4.5 km || 
|-id=486 bgcolor=#fefefe
| 6486 Anitahill || 1991 FO ||  || March 17, 1991 || Palomar || E. F. Helin || V || align=right | 3.3 km || 
|-id=487 bgcolor=#FA8072
| 6487 Tonyspear ||  ||  || April 8, 1991 || Palomar || E. F. Helin || PHO || align=right | 5.1 km || 
|-id=488 bgcolor=#fefefe
| 6488 Drebach ||  ||  || April 10, 1991 || Tautenburg Observatory || F. Börngen || — || align=right | 9.1 km || 
|-id=489 bgcolor=#FFC2E0
| 6489 Golevka || 1991 JX ||  || May 10, 1991 || Palomar || E. F. Helin || APOPHAcritical || align=right data-sort-value="0.53" | 530 m || 
|-id=490 bgcolor=#FA8072
| 6490 ||  || — || July 12, 1991 || Palomar || H. E. Holt || — || align=right | 5.1 km || 
|-id=491 bgcolor=#FFC2E0
| 6491 || 1991 OA || — || July 16, 1991 || Palomar || H. E. Holt || AMOPHA || align=right data-sort-value="0.65" | 650 m || 
|-id=492 bgcolor=#d6d6d6
| 6492 ||  || — || July 18, 1991 || La Silla || H. Debehogne || KOR || align=right | 8.3 km || 
|-id=493 bgcolor=#fefefe
| 6493 Cathybennett || 1992 CA ||  || February 2, 1992 || Palomar || E. F. Helin || H || align=right | 4.4 km || 
|-id=494 bgcolor=#fefefe
| 6494 || 1992 NM || — || July 8, 1992 || Kiyosato || S. Otomo || — || align=right | 5.0 km || 
|-id=495 bgcolor=#fefefe
| 6495 ||  || — || October 19, 1992 || Kushiro || S. Ueda, H. Kaneda || — || align=right | 5.3 km || 
|-id=496 bgcolor=#E9E9E9
| 6496 Kazuko ||  ||  || October 19, 1992 || Kitami || K. Endate, K. Watanabe || — || align=right | 7.2 km || 
|-id=497 bgcolor=#fefefe
| 6497 Yamasaki ||  ||  || October 27, 1992 || Geisei || T. Seki || FLO || align=right | 3.4 km || 
|-id=498 bgcolor=#fefefe
| 6498 Ko ||  ||  || October 26, 1992 || Kitami || K. Endate, K. Watanabe || slow || align=right | 6.0 km || 
|-id=499 bgcolor=#E9E9E9
| 6499 Michiko ||  ||  || October 27, 1992 || Nyukasa || M. Hirasawa, S. Suzuki || GEF || align=right | 8.9 km || 
|-id=500 bgcolor=#FA8072
| 6500 Kodaira || 1993 ET ||  || March 15, 1993 || Kitami || K. Endate, K. Watanabe || — || align=right | 9.5 km || 
|}

6501–6600 

|-bgcolor=#fefefe
| 6501 Isonzo || 1993 XD ||  || December 5, 1993 || Farra d'Isonzo || Farra d'Isonzo || V || align=right | 2.5 km || 
|-id=502 bgcolor=#fefefe
| 6502 ||  || — || December 6, 1993 || Kushiro || S. Ueda, H. Kaneda || FLO || align=right | 4.9 km || 
|-id=503 bgcolor=#d6d6d6
| 6503 || 1994 CP || — || February 4, 1994 || Kushiro || S. Ueda, H. Kaneda || — || align=right | 13 km || 
|-id=504 bgcolor=#fefefe
| 6504 Lehmbruck || 4630 P-L ||  || September 24, 1960 || Palomar || PLS || — || align=right | 4.4 km || 
|-id=505 bgcolor=#d6d6d6
| 6505 Muzzio || 1976 AH ||  || January 3, 1976 || El Leoncito || Félix Aguilar Obs. || — || align=right | 16 km || 
|-id=506 bgcolor=#fefefe
| 6506 Klausheide ||  ||  || March 15, 1978 || Palomar || S. J. Bus || V || align=right | 3.5 km || 
|-id=507 bgcolor=#fefefe
| 6507 || 1982 QD || — || August 18, 1982 || Kleť || Z. Vávrová || — || align=right | 3.4 km || 
|-id=508 bgcolor=#E9E9E9
| 6508 Rolčík || 1982 QM ||  || August 22, 1982 || Kleť || A. Mrkos || — || align=right | 12 km || 
|-id=509 bgcolor=#E9E9E9
| 6509 Giovannipratesi ||  ||  || February 12, 1983 || La Silla || H. Debehogne, G. DeSanctis || DOR || align=right | 15 km || 
|-id=510 bgcolor=#fefefe
| 6510 Tarry || 1987 DF ||  || February 23, 1987 || Palomar || C. S. Shoemaker, E. M. Shoemaker || PHO || align=right | 6.7 km || 
|-id=511 bgcolor=#E9E9E9
| 6511 Furmanov ||  ||  || August 27, 1987 || Nauchnij || L. I. Chernykh || — || align=right | 9.4 km || 
|-id=512 bgcolor=#E9E9E9
| 6512 de Bergh ||  ||  || September 21, 1987 || Anderson Mesa || E. Bowell || — || align=right | 5.2 km || 
|-id=513 bgcolor=#E9E9E9
| 6513 ||  || — || October 28, 1987 || Kushiro || S. Ueda, H. Kaneda || — || align=right | 5.5 km || 
|-id=514 bgcolor=#E9E9E9
| 6514 Torahiko || 1987 WY ||  || November 25, 1987 || Geisei || T. Seki || — || align=right | 7.6 km || 
|-id=515 bgcolor=#fefefe
| 6515 Giannigalli || 1988 MG ||  || June 16, 1988 || Palomar || E. F. Helin || — || align=right | 4.4 km || 
|-id=516 bgcolor=#fefefe
| 6516 Gruss ||  ||  || October 3, 1988 || Kleť || A. Mrkos || — || align=right | 6.2 km || 
|-id=517 bgcolor=#fefefe
| 6517 Buzzi || 1990 BW ||  || January 21, 1990 || Palomar || E. F. Helin || H || align=right | 2.8 km || 
|-id=518 bgcolor=#E9E9E9
| 6518 Vernon || 1990 FR ||  || March 23, 1990 || Palomar || E. F. Helin || — || align=right | 13 km || 
|-id=519 bgcolor=#fefefe
| 6519 Giono ||  ||  || February 12, 1991 || Haute-Provence || E. W. Elst || — || align=right | 4.6 km || 
|-id=520 bgcolor=#fefefe
| 6520 Sugawa || 1991 HH ||  || April 16, 1991 || Kiyosato || S. Otomo, O. Muramatsu || FLO || align=right | 4.3 km || 
|-id=521 bgcolor=#fefefe
| 6521 Pina ||  ||  || June 15, 1991 || Palomar || E. F. Helin || — || align=right | 4.4 km || 
|-id=522 bgcolor=#fefefe
| 6522 Aci || 1991 NQ ||  || July 9, 1991 || Palomar || E. F. Helin || PHO || align=right | 6.1 km || 
|-id=523 bgcolor=#FA8072
| 6523 Clube || 1991 TC ||  || October 1, 1991 || Siding Spring || R. H. McNaught || — || align=right | 4.0 km || 
|-id=524 bgcolor=#fefefe
| 6524 Baalke || 1992 AO ||  || January 9, 1992 || Palomar || E. F. Helin || — || align=right | 6.3 km || 
|-id=525 bgcolor=#fefefe
| 6525 Ocastron ||  ||  || September 20, 1992 || Wrightwood || J. B. Child, G. Fisch || — || align=right | 3.5 km || 
|-id=526 bgcolor=#fefefe
| 6526 Matogawa || 1992 TY ||  || October 1, 1992 || Kitami || K. Endate, K. Watanabe || FLO || align=right | 5.0 km || 
|-id=527 bgcolor=#fefefe
| 6527 Takashiito ||  ||  || October 31, 1992 || Yakiimo || A. Natori, T. Urata || — || align=right | 4.7 km || 
|-id=528 bgcolor=#fefefe
| 6528 Boden ||  ||  || March 21, 1993 || La Silla || UESAC || — || align=right | 4.0 km || 
|-id=529 bgcolor=#fefefe
| 6529 Rhoads ||  ||  || December 14, 1993 || Palomar || Palomar Obs. || — || align=right | 4.3 km || 
|-id=530 bgcolor=#E9E9E9
| 6530 Adry || 1994 GW ||  || April 12, 1994 || Colleverde || V. S. Casulli || EUN || align=right | 6.5 km || 
|-id=531 bgcolor=#d6d6d6
| 6531 Subashiri || 1994 YY ||  || December 28, 1994 || Oizumi || T. Kobayashi || THM || align=right | 12 km || 
|-id=532 bgcolor=#d6d6d6
| 6532 Scarfe || 1995 AC ||  || January 4, 1995 || Climenhaga || D. D. Balam || — || align=right | 12 km || 
|-id=533 bgcolor=#E9E9E9
| 6533 Giuseppina ||  ||  || February 24, 1995 || Catalina Station || C. W. Hergenrother || HNS || align=right | 7.7 km || 
|-id=534 bgcolor=#d6d6d6
| 6534 Carriepeterson ||  ||  || February 24, 1995 || Catalina Station || T. B. Spahr || ALA || align=right | 13 km || 
|-id=535 bgcolor=#fefefe
| 6535 Archipenko || 3535 P-L ||  || October 17, 1960 || Palomar || PLS || — || align=right | 9.0 km || 
|-id=536 bgcolor=#fefefe
| 6536 Vysochinska || 1977 NK ||  || July 14, 1977 || Nauchnij || N. S. Chernykh || FLO || align=right | 4.4 km || 
|-id=537 bgcolor=#fefefe
| 6537 Adamovich ||  ||  || August 19, 1979 || Nauchnij || N. S. Chernykh || FLO || align=right | 4.3 km || 
|-id=538 bgcolor=#d6d6d6
| 6538 Muraviov ||  ||  || September 25, 1981 || Nauchnij || L. I. Chernykh || KOR || align=right | 8.3 km || 
|-id=539 bgcolor=#E9E9E9
| 6539 Nohavica || 1982 QG ||  || August 19, 1982 || Kleť || Z. Vávrová || — || align=right | 8.6 km || 
|-id=540 bgcolor=#fefefe
| 6540 Stepling ||  ||  || September 16, 1982 || Kleť || A. Mrkos || FLO || align=right | 5.2 km || 
|-id=541 bgcolor=#d6d6d6
| 6541 Yuan || 1984 DY ||  || February 26, 1984 || La Silla || H. Debehogne || THM || align=right | 14 km || 
|-id=542 bgcolor=#fefefe
| 6542 Jacquescousteau ||  ||  || February 15, 1985 || Kleť || A. Mrkos || — || align=right | 8.9 km || 
|-id=543 bgcolor=#fefefe
| 6543 Senna ||  ||  || October 11, 1985 || Palomar || C. S. Shoemaker, E. M. Shoemaker || — || align=right | 3.4 km || 
|-id=544 bgcolor=#E9E9E9
| 6544 Stevendick || 1986 SD ||  || September 29, 1986 || Kleť || Z. Vávrová || AGN || align=right | 7.8 km || 
|-id=545 bgcolor=#C2FFFF
| 6545 Leitus ||  ||  || October 5, 1986 || Piwnice || M. Antal || L4 || align=right | 51 km || 
|-id=546 bgcolor=#d6d6d6
| 6546 Kaye ||  ||  || February 24, 1987 || Kleť || A. Mrkos || — || align=right | 22 km || 
|-id=547 bgcolor=#E9E9E9
| 6547 Vasilkarazin ||  ||  || September 2, 1987 || Nauchnij || L. I. Chernykh || — || align=right | 3.6 km || 
|-id=548 bgcolor=#d6d6d6
| 6548 ||  || — || January 22, 1988 || La Silla || H. Debehogne || EOS || align=right | 13 km || 
|-id=549 bgcolor=#fefefe
| 6549 Skryabin ||  ||  || August 13, 1988 || Haute-Provence || E. W. Elst || V || align=right | 4.1 km || 
|-id=550 bgcolor=#fefefe
| 6550 Parléř ||  ||  || November 4, 1988 || Kleť || A. Mrkos || — || align=right | 5.5 km || 
|-id=551 bgcolor=#fefefe
| 6551 || 1988 XP || — || December 5, 1988 || Chiyoda || T. Kojima || — || align=right | 5.7 km || 
|-id=552 bgcolor=#E9E9E9
| 6552 Higginson || 1989 GH ||  || April 5, 1989 || Palomar || E. F. Helin || ADE || align=right | 9.4 km || 
|-id=553 bgcolor=#d6d6d6
| 6553 Seehaus ||  ||  || April 5, 1989 || La Silla || M. Geffert || — || align=right | 10 km || 
|-id=554 bgcolor=#fefefe
| 6554 Takatsuguyoshida ||  ||  || October 28, 1989 || Kani || Y. Mizuno, T. Furuta || FLO || align=right | 3.9 km || 
|-id=555 bgcolor=#fefefe
| 6555 ||  || — || October 29, 1989 || Chiyoda || T. Kojima || — || align=right | 6.5 km || 
|-id=556 bgcolor=#fefefe
| 6556 Arcimboldo ||  ||  || December 29, 1989 || Kleť || A. Mrkos || FLO || align=right | 5.0 km || 
|-id=557 bgcolor=#d6d6d6
| 6557 Yokonomura ||  ||  || November 11, 1990 || Minami-Oda || T. Nomura, K. Kawanishi || — || align=right | 16 km || 
|-id=558 bgcolor=#fefefe
| 6558 Norizuki || 1991 GZ ||  || April 14, 1991 || Kitami || K. Endate, K. Watanabe || — || align=right | 4.2 km || 
|-id=559 bgcolor=#fefefe
| 6559 Nomura || 1991 JP ||  || May 3, 1991 || Minami-Oda || M. Sugano, K. Kawanishi || — || align=right | 9.4 km || 
|-id=560 bgcolor=#fefefe
| 6560 Pravdo || 1991 NP ||  || July 9, 1991 || Palomar || E. F. Helin || — || align=right | 7.6 km || 
|-id=561 bgcolor=#E9E9E9
| 6561 Gruppetta ||  ||  || October 10, 1991 || Palomar || K. J. Lawrence || EUN || align=right | 6.2 km || 
|-id=562 bgcolor=#fefefe
| 6562 Takoyaki ||  ||  || November 9, 1991 || Kitami || M. Yanai, K. Watanabe || — || align=right | 3.8 km || 
|-id=563 bgcolor=#fefefe
| 6563 Steinheim ||  ||  || December 11, 1991 || Tautenburg Observatory || F. Börngen || — || align=right | 3.3 km || 
|-id=564 bgcolor=#FA8072
| 6564 Asher || 1992 BB ||  || January 25, 1992 || Siding Spring || R. H. McNaught || — || align=right | 1.7 km || 
|-id=565 bgcolor=#fefefe
| 6565 Reiji || 1992 FT ||  || March 23, 1992 || Kitami || K. Endate, K. Watanabe || — || align=right | 4.1 km || 
|-id=566 bgcolor=#fefefe
| 6566 Shafter ||  ||  || October 25, 1992 || Oohira || T. Urata || FLO || align=right | 3.8 km || 
|-id=567 bgcolor=#fefefe
| 6567 Shigemasa || 1992 WS ||  || November 16, 1992 || Kitami || K. Endate, K. Watanabe || FLO || align=right | 4.6 km || 
|-id=568 bgcolor=#E9E9E9
| 6568 Serendip || 1993 DT ||  || February 21, 1993 || Kushiro || S. Ueda, H. Kaneda || — || align=right | 9.9 km || 
|-id=569 bgcolor=#FFC2E0
| 6569 Ondaatje || 1993 MO ||  || June 22, 1993 || Palomar || J. E. Mueller || AMO +1km || align=right | 1.6 km || 
|-id=570 bgcolor=#d6d6d6
| 6570 Tomohiro || 1994 JO ||  || May 6, 1994 || Kitami || K. Endate, K. Watanabe || MEL || align=right | 23 km || 
|-id=571 bgcolor=#fefefe
| 6571 Sigmund || 3027 P-L ||  || September 24, 1960 || Palomar || PLS || — || align=right | 4.5 km || 
|-id=572 bgcolor=#E9E9E9
| 6572 Carson || 1938 SX ||  || September 22, 1938 || Turku || Y. Väisälä || — || align=right | 8.4 km || 
|-id=573 bgcolor=#E9E9E9
| 6573 Magnitskij ||  ||  || September 19, 1974 || Nauchnij || L. I. Chernykh || — || align=right | 7.4 km || 
|-id=574 bgcolor=#d6d6d6
| 6574 Gvishiani ||  ||  || August 26, 1976 || Nauchnij || N. S. Chernykh || 7:4 || align=right | 25 km || 
|-id=575 bgcolor=#d6d6d6
| 6575 Slavov ||  ||  || August 8, 1978 || Nauchnij || N. S. Chernykh || HYG || align=right | 12 km || 
|-id=576 bgcolor=#d6d6d6
| 6576 Kievtech ||  ||  || September 5, 1978 || Nauchnij || N. S. Chernykh || THM || align=right | 17 km || 
|-id=577 bgcolor=#fefefe
| 6577 Torbenwolff ||  ||  || November 7, 1978 || Palomar || E. F. Helin, S. J. Bus || PHO || align=right | 5.4 km || 
|-id=578 bgcolor=#fefefe
| 6578 Zapesotskij ||  ||  || October 13, 1980 || Nauchnij || T. M. Smirnova || NYS || align=right | 7.9 km || 
|-id=579 bgcolor=#E9E9E9
| 6579 Benedix ||  ||  || March 2, 1981 || Siding Spring || S. J. Bus || — || align=right | 6.5 km || 
|-id=580 bgcolor=#E9E9E9
| 6580 Philbland ||  ||  || March 2, 1981 || Siding Spring || S. J. Bus || — || align=right | 7.4 km || 
|-id=581 bgcolor=#fefefe
| 6581 Sobers || 1981 SO ||  || September 22, 1981 || Kleť || A. Mrkos || — || align=right | 5.7 km || 
|-id=582 bgcolor=#E9E9E9
| 6582 Flagsymphony || 1981 VS ||  || November 5, 1981 || Anderson Mesa || E. Bowell || CLOslow || align=right | 19 km || 
|-id=583 bgcolor=#E9E9E9
| 6583 Destinn || 1984 DE ||  || February 21, 1984 || Kleť || A. Mrkos || — || align=right | 11 km || 
|-id=584 bgcolor=#fefefe
| 6584 Ludekpesek || 1984 FK ||  || March 31, 1984 || Anderson Mesa || E. Bowell || — || align=right | 5.8 km || 
|-id=585 bgcolor=#FA8072
| 6585 O'Keefe || 1984 SR ||  || September 26, 1984 || Palomar || C. S. Shoemaker, E. M. Shoemaker || — || align=right | 3.9 km || 
|-id=586 bgcolor=#fefefe
| 6586 Seydler ||  ||  || October 28, 1984 || Kleť || A. Mrkos || — || align=right | 5.3 km || 
|-id=587 bgcolor=#fefefe
| 6587 Brassens ||  ||  || November 27, 1984 || Caussols || CERGA || — || align=right | 4.1 km || 
|-id=588 bgcolor=#d6d6d6
| 6588 ||  || — || September 10, 1985 || La Silla || H. Debehogne || KOR || align=right | 9.1 km || 
|-id=589 bgcolor=#fefefe
| 6589 Jankovich ||  ||  || September 19, 1985 || Nauchnij || N. S. Chernykh, L. I. Chernykh || FLO || align=right | 3.9 km || 
|-id=590 bgcolor=#d6d6d6
| 6590 Barolo ||  ||  || October 15, 1985 || Anderson Mesa || E. Bowell || EOS || align=right | 11 km || 
|-id=591 bgcolor=#E9E9E9
| 6591 Sabinin ||  ||  || September 7, 1986 || Nauchnij || L. I. Chernykh || — || align=right | 9.8 km || 
|-id=592 bgcolor=#E9E9E9
| 6592 Goya ||  ||  || October 3, 1986 || Nauchnij || L. G. Karachkina || MRX || align=right | 5.5 km || 
|-id=593 bgcolor=#E9E9E9
| 6593 || 1986 UV || — || October 28, 1986 || Kleť || Z. Vávrová || PAD || align=right | 10 km || 
|-id=594 bgcolor=#E9E9E9
| 6594 Tasman ||  ||  || June 25, 1987 || Kleť || A. Mrkos || GEF || align=right | 7.0 km || 
|-id=595 bgcolor=#fefefe
| 6595 Munizbarreto ||  ||  || August 21, 1987 || La Silla || E. W. Elst || — || align=right | 3.3 km || 
|-id=596 bgcolor=#E9E9E9
| 6596 Bittner ||  ||  || November 15, 1987 || Kleť || A. Mrkos || — || align=right | 6.9 km || 
|-id=597 bgcolor=#E9E9E9
| 6597 Kreil ||  ||  || January 9, 1988 || Kleť || A. Mrkos || — || align=right | 3.3 km || 
|-id=598 bgcolor=#E9E9E9
| 6598 Modugno || 1988 CL ||  || February 13, 1988 || Bologna || San Vittore Obs. || — || align=right | 11 km || 
|-id=599 bgcolor=#fefefe
| 6599 Tsuko || 1988 PV ||  || August 8, 1988 || Kitami || K. Endate, K. Watanabe || FLO || align=right | 3.4 km || 
|-id=600 bgcolor=#fefefe
| 6600 Qwerty || 1988 QW ||  || August 17, 1988 || Kleť || A. Mrkos || — || align=right | 3.7 km || 
|}

6601–6700 

|-bgcolor=#fefefe
| 6601 Schmeer ||  ||  || December 7, 1988 || Kushiro || S. Ueda, H. Kaneda || — || align=right | 6.9 km || 
|-id=602 bgcolor=#fefefe
| 6602 Gilclark || 1989 EC ||  || March 4, 1989 || Palomar || E. F. Helin || H || align=right | 4.1 km || 
|-id=603 bgcolor=#E9E9E9
| 6603 Marycragg ||  ||  || May 19, 1990 || Palomar || E. F. Helin || — || align=right | 11 km || 
|-id=604 bgcolor=#E9E9E9
| 6604 Ilias ||  ||  || August 16, 1990 || La Silla || E. W. Elst || — || align=right | 12 km || 
|-id=605 bgcolor=#d6d6d6
| 6605 Carmontelle ||  ||  || September 22, 1990 || La Silla || E. W. Elst || KOR || align=right | 7.5 km || 
|-id=606 bgcolor=#d6d6d6
| 6606 Makino || 1990 UF ||  || October 16, 1990 || Geisei || T. Seki || HYG || align=right | 14 km || 
|-id=607 bgcolor=#E9E9E9
| 6607 Matsushima ||  ||  || October 29, 1991 || Kitami || K. Endate, K. Watanabe || — || align=right | 7.4 km || 
|-id=608 bgcolor=#fefefe
| 6608 Davidecrespi ||  ||  || November 2, 1991 || Palomar || E. F. Helin || — || align=right | 5.6 km || 
|-id=609 bgcolor=#d6d6d6
| 6609 || 1992 BN || — || January 28, 1992 || Kushiro || S. Ueda, H. Kaneda || EOS || align=right | 14 km || 
|-id=610 bgcolor=#fefefe
| 6610 Burwitz ||  ||  || January 28, 1993 || Yakiimo || A. Natori, T. Urata || FLO || align=right | 5.2 km || 
|-id=611 bgcolor=#FFC2E0
| 6611 || 1993 VW || — || November 9, 1993 || Palomar || E. F. Helin, J. Alu || APO +1km || align=right | 1.4 km || 
|-id=612 bgcolor=#fefefe
| 6612 Hachioji ||  ||  || March 10, 1994 || Yatsugatake || Y. Kushida, O. Muramatsu || NYS || align=right | 4.7 km || 
|-id=613 bgcolor=#d6d6d6
| 6613 Williamcarl || 1994 LK ||  || June 2, 1994 || Catalina Station || C. W. Hergenrother || — || align=right | 19 km || 
|-id=614 bgcolor=#fefefe
| 6614 Antisthenes || 6530 P-L ||  || September 24, 1960 || Palomar || PLS || — || align=right | 9.2 km || 
|-id=615 bgcolor=#fefefe
| 6615 Plutarchos || 9512 P-L ||  || October 17, 1960 || Palomar || PLS || moon || align=right | 3.1 km || 
|-id=616 bgcolor=#fefefe
| 6616 Plotinos || 1175 T-1 ||  || March 25, 1971 || Palomar || PLS || V || align=right | 4.1 km || 
|-id=617 bgcolor=#fefefe
| 6617 Boethius || 2218 T-1 ||  || March 25, 1971 || Palomar || PLS || — || align=right | 3.7 km || 
|-id=618 bgcolor=#fefefe
| 6618 Jimsimons || 1936 SO ||  || September 16, 1936 || Flagstaff || C. W. Tombaugh || H || align=right | 12 km || 
|-id=619 bgcolor=#d6d6d6
| 6619 Kolya ||  ||  || September 27, 1973 || Nauchnij || L. I. Chernykh || — || align=right | 30 km || 
|-id=620 bgcolor=#E9E9E9
| 6620 Peregrina || 1973 UC ||  || October 25, 1973 || Zimmerwald || P. Wild || — || align=right | 8.0 km || 
|-id=621 bgcolor=#E9E9E9
| 6621 Timchuk ||  ||  || November 2, 1975 || Nauchnij || T. M. Smirnova || — || align=right | 12 km || 
|-id=622 bgcolor=#d6d6d6
| 6622 Matvienko ||  ||  || September 5, 1978 || Nauchnij || N. S. Chernykh || — || align=right | 10 km || 
|-id=623 bgcolor=#fefefe
| 6623 Trioconbrio ||  ||  || June 25, 1979 || Siding Spring || E. F. Helin, S. J. Bus || — || align=right | 5.5 km || 
|-id=624 bgcolor=#fefefe
| 6624 || 1980 SG || — || September 16, 1980 || Kleť || Z. Vávrová || V || align=right | 4.7 km || 
|-id=625 bgcolor=#d6d6d6
| 6625 Nyquist ||  ||  || March 2, 1981 || Siding Spring || S. J. Bus || THM || align=right | 9.7 km || 
|-id=626 bgcolor=#d6d6d6
| 6626 Mattgenge ||  ||  || March 2, 1981 || Siding Spring || S. J. Bus || slow || align=right | 8.0 km || 
|-id=627 bgcolor=#fefefe
| 6627 || 1981 FT || — || March 27, 1981 || Kleť || Z. Vávrová || — || align=right | 4.1 km || 
|-id=628 bgcolor=#d6d6d6
| 6628 Dondelia ||  ||  || November 24, 1981 || Anderson Mesa || E. Bowell || KOR || align=right | 8.4 km || 
|-id=629 bgcolor=#fefefe
| 6629 Kurtz || 1982 UP ||  || October 17, 1982 || Anderson Mesa || E. Bowell || — || align=right | 2.9 km || 
|-id=630 bgcolor=#fefefe
| 6630 Skepticus ||  ||  || November 15, 1982 || Anderson Mesa || E. Bowell || FLO || align=right | 4.6 km || 
|-id=631 bgcolor=#fefefe
| 6631 Pyatnitskij ||  ||  || September 4, 1983 || Nauchnij || L. V. Zhuravleva || — || align=right | 14 km || 
|-id=632 bgcolor=#fefefe
| 6632 Scoon ||  ||  || October 29, 1984 || Anderson Mesa || E. Bowell || V || align=right | 3.7 km || 
|-id=633 bgcolor=#E9E9E9
| 6633 ||  || — || October 11, 1986 || Brorfelde || P. Jensen || — || align=right | 8.6 km || 
|-id=634 bgcolor=#fefefe
| 6634 || 1987 KB || — || May 23, 1987 || Campinas || Campinas Obs. || — || align=right | 11 km || 
|-id=635 bgcolor=#fefefe
| 6635 Zuber ||  ||  || September 26, 1987 || Palomar || C. S. Shoemaker, E. M. Shoemaker || H || align=right | 3.9 km || 
|-id=636 bgcolor=#fefefe
| 6636 Kintanar ||  ||  || September 11, 1988 || Smolyan || V. G. Shkodrov || — || align=right | 3.6 km || 
|-id=637 bgcolor=#fefefe
| 6637 Inoue || 1988 XZ ||  || December 3, 1988 || Kitami || K. Endate, K. Watanabe || — || align=right | 4.8 km || 
|-id=638 bgcolor=#fefefe
| 6638 || 1989 CA || — || February 2, 1989 || Yorii || M. Arai, H. Mori || NYS || align=right | 5.7 km || 
|-id=639 bgcolor=#d6d6d6
| 6639 Marchis ||  ||  || September 25, 1989 || La Silla || H. Debehogne || THM || align=right | 14 km || 
|-id=640 bgcolor=#fefefe
| 6640 Falorni || 1990 DL ||  || February 24, 1990 || Bologna || San Vittore Obs. || — || align=right | 3.4 km || 
|-id=641 bgcolor=#E9E9E9
| 6641 Bobross ||  ||  || July 29, 1990 || Palomar || H. E. Holt || — || align=right | 6.1 km || 
|-id=642 bgcolor=#d6d6d6
| 6642 Henze ||  ||  || October 26, 1990 || Oohira || T. Urata || — || align=right | 15 km || 
|-id=643 bgcolor=#d6d6d6
| 6643 Morikubo || 1990 VZ ||  || November 7, 1990 || Yatsugatake || Y. Kushida, O. Muramatsu || — || align=right | 13 km || 
|-id=644 bgcolor=#d6d6d6
| 6644 Jugaku || 1991 AA ||  || January 5, 1991 || Kitami || A. Takahashi, K. Watanabe || HYG || align=right | 14 km || 
|-id=645 bgcolor=#d6d6d6
| 6645 Arcetri ||  ||  || January 11, 1991 || Palomar || E. F. Helin || THM || align=right | 12 km || 
|-id=646 bgcolor=#fefefe
| 6646 Churanta ||  ||  || February 14, 1991 || Palomar || E. F. Helin || H || align=right | 1.9 km || 
|-id=647 bgcolor=#fefefe
| 6647 Josse ||  ||  || April 8, 1991 || La Silla || E. W. Elst || — || align=right | 6.5 km || 
|-id=648 bgcolor=#E9E9E9
| 6648 ||  || — || August 9, 1991 || Palomar || H. E. Holt || — || align=right | 6.3 km || 
|-id=649 bgcolor=#E9E9E9
| 6649 Yokotatakao || 1991 RN ||  || September 5, 1991 || Yakiimo || A. Natori, T. Urata || — || align=right | 7.4 km || 
|-id=650 bgcolor=#E9E9E9
| 6650 Morimoto ||  ||  || September 7, 1991 || Kitami || K. Endate, K. Watanabe || — || align=right | 7.5 km || 
|-id=651 bgcolor=#fefefe
| 6651 Rogervenable ||  ||  || September 10, 1991 || Palomar || H. E. Holt || — || align=right | 4.9 km || 
|-id=652 bgcolor=#E9E9E9
| 6652 ||  || — || September 16, 1991 || Palomar || H. E. Holt || — || align=right | 7.9 km || 
|-id=653 bgcolor=#d6d6d6
| 6653 Feininger ||  ||  || December 10, 1991 || Tautenburg Observatory || F. Börngen || KOR || align=right | 6.2 km || 
|-id=654 bgcolor=#d6d6d6
| 6654 Luleå ||  ||  || February 29, 1992 || La Silla || UESAC || HYG || align=right | 12 km || 
|-id=655 bgcolor=#d6d6d6
| 6655 Nagahama ||  ||  || March 8, 1992 || Dynic || A. Sugie || EOS || align=right | 16 km || 
|-id=656 bgcolor=#d6d6d6
| 6656 Yokota || 1992 FF ||  || March 23, 1992 || Kitami || K. Endate, K. Watanabe || THM || align=right | 19 km || 
|-id=657 bgcolor=#fefefe
| 6657 Otukyo || 1992 WY ||  || November 17, 1992 || Dynic || A. Sugie || — || align=right | 2.7 km || 
|-id=658 bgcolor=#fefefe
| 6658 Akiraabe ||  ||  || November 18, 1992 || Kitami || K. Endate, K. Watanabe || — || align=right | 6.1 km || 
|-id=659 bgcolor=#fefefe
| 6659 Pietsch || 1992 YN ||  || December 24, 1992 || Oohira || T. Urata || V || align=right | 5.5 km || 
|-id=660 bgcolor=#fefefe
| 6660 Matsumoto || 1993 BC ||  || January 16, 1993 || Geisei || T. Seki || NYS || align=right | 3.1 km || 
|-id=661 bgcolor=#fefefe
| 6661 Ikemura || 1993 BO ||  || January 17, 1993 || Kani || Y. Mizuno, T. Furuta || NYS || align=right | 11 km || 
|-id=662 bgcolor=#E9E9E9
| 6662 ||  || — || January 22, 1993 || Kushiro || S. Ueda, H. Kaneda || EUN || align=right | 8.3 km || 
|-id=663 bgcolor=#E9E9E9
| 6663 Tatebayashi || 1993 CC ||  || February 12, 1993 || Oizumi || T. Kobayashi || EUN || align=right | 8.6 km || 
|-id=664 bgcolor=#fefefe
| 6664 Tennyo || 1993 CK ||  || February 14, 1993 || Oizumi || T. Kobayashi || FLO || align=right | 4.2 km || 
|-id=665 bgcolor=#d6d6d6
| 6665 Kagawa || 1993 CN ||  || February 14, 1993 || Oohira || T. Urata || EOS || align=right | 12 km || 
|-id=666 bgcolor=#E9E9E9
| 6666 Frö ||  ||  || March 19, 1993 || La Silla || UESAC || — || align=right | 4.1 km || 
|-id=667 bgcolor=#fefefe
| 6667 Sannaimura ||  ||  || March 14, 1994 || Yatsugatake || Y. Kushida, O. Muramatsu || — || align=right | 6.0 km || 
|-id=668 bgcolor=#E9E9E9
| 6668 ||  || — || April 11, 1994 || Kushiro || S. Ueda, H. Kaneda || — || align=right | 16 km || 
|-id=669 bgcolor=#fefefe
| 6669 Obi ||  ||  || May 5, 1994 || Kitami || K. Endate, K. Watanabe || FLO || align=right | 6.2 km || 
|-id=670 bgcolor=#E9E9E9
| 6670 Wallach ||  ||  || June 4, 1994 || Palomar || C. S. Shoemaker, D. H. Levy || — || align=right | 8.7 km || 
|-id=671 bgcolor=#d6d6d6
| 6671 Concari ||  ||  || July 5, 1994 || Palomar || E. F. Helin || — || align=right | 11 km || 
|-id=672 bgcolor=#fefefe
| 6672 Corot || 1213 T-1 ||  || March 24, 1971 || Palomar || PLS || — || align=right | 2.1 km || 
|-id=673 bgcolor=#fefefe
| 6673 Degas || 2246 T-1 ||  || March 25, 1971 || Palomar || PLS || — || align=right | 12 km || 
|-id=674 bgcolor=#fefefe
| 6674 Cézanne || 4272 T-1 ||  || March 26, 1971 || Palomar || PLS || NYS || align=right | 12 km || 
|-id=675 bgcolor=#d6d6d6
| 6675 Sisley || 1493 T-2 ||  || September 29, 1973 || Palomar || PLS || — || align=right | 8.2 km || 
|-id=676 bgcolor=#d6d6d6
| 6676 Monet || 2083 T-2 ||  || September 29, 1973 || Palomar || PLS || THM || align=right | 11 km || 
|-id=677 bgcolor=#d6d6d6
| 6677 Renoir || 3045 T-3 ||  || October 16, 1977 || Palomar || PLS || — || align=right | 19 km || 
|-id=678 bgcolor=#E9E9E9
| 6678 Seurat || 3422 T-3 ||  || October 16, 1977 || Palomar || PLS || — || align=right | 7.3 km || 
|-id=679 bgcolor=#fefefe
| 6679 Gurzhij ||  ||  || October 16, 1969 || Nauchnij || L. I. Chernykh || — || align=right | 4.1 km || 
|-id=680 bgcolor=#fefefe
| 6680 || 1970 WD || — || November 24, 1970 || Hamburg-Bergedorf || L. Kohoutek || — || align=right | 4.5 km || 
|-id=681 bgcolor=#fefefe
| 6681 Prokopovich ||  ||  || September 6, 1972 || Nauchnij || L. V. Zhuravleva || — || align=right | 4.3 km || 
|-id=682 bgcolor=#fefefe
| 6682 Makarij ||  ||  || September 25, 1973 || Nauchnij || L. V. Zhuravleva || — || align=right | 3.9 km || 
|-id=683 bgcolor=#d6d6d6
| 6683 Karachentsov ||  ||  || April 1, 1976 || Nauchnij || N. S. Chernykh || — || align=right | 19 km || 
|-id=684 bgcolor=#E9E9E9
| 6684 Volodshevchenko || 1977 QU ||  || August 19, 1977 || Nauchnij || N. S. Chernykh || — || align=right | 5.1 km || 
|-id=685 bgcolor=#fefefe
| 6685 Boitsov ||  ||  || August 31, 1978 || Nauchnij || N. S. Chernykh || FLO || align=right | 3.6 km || 
|-id=686 bgcolor=#d6d6d6
| 6686 Hernius ||  ||  || August 22, 1979 || La Silla || C.-I. Lagerkvist || KOR || align=right | 8.6 km || 
|-id=687 bgcolor=#fefefe
| 6687 Lahulla ||  ||  || March 16, 1980 || La Silla || C.-I. Lagerkvist || — || align=right | 3.4 km || 
|-id=688 bgcolor=#d6d6d6
| 6688 Donmccarthy ||  ||  || March 2, 1981 || Siding Spring || S. J. Bus || HYG || align=right | 8.9 km || 
|-id=689 bgcolor=#fefefe
| 6689 Floss ||  ||  || March 2, 1981 || Siding Spring || S. J. Bus || FLO || align=right | 3.0 km || 
|-id=690 bgcolor=#fefefe
| 6690 Messick ||  ||  || September 25, 1981 || Anderson Mesa || B. A. Skiff || FLO || align=right | 4.0 km || 
|-id=691 bgcolor=#E9E9E9
| 6691 Trussoni || 1984 DX ||  || February 26, 1984 || La Silla || H. Debehogne || — || align=right | 4.2 km || 
|-id=692 bgcolor=#E9E9E9
| 6692 Antonínholý || 1985 HL ||  || April 18, 1985 || Kleť || Z. Vávrová || — || align=right | 3.8 km || 
|-id=693 bgcolor=#fefefe
| 6693 ||  || — || February 12, 1986 || La Silla || H. Debehogne || — || align=right | 8.4 km || 
|-id=694 bgcolor=#E9E9E9
| 6694 || 1986 PF || — || August 4, 1986 || Palomar || INAS || — || align=right | 7.5 km || 
|-id=695 bgcolor=#E9E9E9
| 6695 Barrettduff ||  ||  || August 1, 1986 || Palomar || E. F. Helin || — || align=right | 5.1 km || 
|-id=696 bgcolor=#E9E9E9
| 6696 Eubanks ||  ||  || September 1, 1986 || Harvard Observatory || Oak Ridge Observatory || MIS || align=right | 9.0 km || 
|-id=697 bgcolor=#d6d6d6
| 6697 Celentano ||  ||  || April 24, 1987 || Kleť || Z. Vávrová || — || align=right | 15 km || 
|-id=698 bgcolor=#fefefe
| 6698 Malhotra ||  ||  || September 21, 1987 || Anderson Mesa || E. Bowell || NYS || align=right | 8.5 km || 
|-id=699 bgcolor=#E9E9E9
| 6699 Igaueno || 1987 YK ||  || December 19, 1987 || Geisei || T. Seki || — || align=right | 5.9 km || 
|-id=700 bgcolor=#E9E9E9
| 6700 Kubišová ||  ||  || January 12, 1988 || Kleť || Z. Vávrová || — || align=right | 10 km || 
|}

6701–6800 

|-bgcolor=#E9E9E9
| 6701 Warhol ||  ||  || January 14, 1988 || Kleť || A. Mrkos || — || align=right | 8.9 km || 
|-id=702 bgcolor=#E9E9E9
| 6702 ||  || — || January 18, 1988 || La Silla || H. Debehogne || — || align=right | 11 km || 
|-id=703 bgcolor=#E9E9E9
| 6703 || 1988 CH || — || February 10, 1988 || Yorii || M. Arai, H. Mori || — || align=right | 6.5 km || 
|-id=704 bgcolor=#E9E9E9
| 6704 || 1988 CJ || — || February 10, 1988 || Yorii || M. Arai, H. Mori || AGN || align=right | 10 km || 
|-id=705 bgcolor=#fefefe
| 6705 Rinaketty ||  ||  || September 2, 1988 || La Silla || H. Debehogne || — || align=right | 3.5 km || 
|-id=706 bgcolor=#fefefe
| 6706 ||  || — || November 11, 1988 || Chiyoda || T. Kojima || NYS || align=right | 5.1 km || 
|-id=707 bgcolor=#fefefe
| 6707 Shigeru ||  ||  || November 13, 1988 || Kitami || M. Yanai, K. Watanabe || — || align=right | 3.1 km || 
|-id=708 bgcolor=#fefefe
| 6708 Bobbievaile ||  ||  || January 4, 1989 || Siding Spring || R. H. McNaught || moon || align=right | 8.1 km || 
|-id=709 bgcolor=#fefefe
| 6709 Hiromiyuki || 1989 CD ||  || February 2, 1989 || Yorii || M. Arai, H. Mori || — || align=right | 4.0 km || 
|-id=710 bgcolor=#E9E9E9
| 6710 Apostel ||  ||  || April 3, 1989 || La Silla || E. W. Elst || — || align=right | 12 km || 
|-id=711 bgcolor=#E9E9E9
| 6711 Holliman || 1989 HG ||  || April 30, 1989 || Palomar || E. F. Helin || — || align=right | 5.2 km || 
|-id=712 bgcolor=#fefefe
| 6712 Hornstein ||  ||  || February 23, 1990 || Kleť || A. Mrkos || — || align=right | 9.3 km || 
|-id=713 bgcolor=#fefefe
| 6713 Coggie || 1990 KM ||  || May 21, 1990 || Palomar || E. F. Helin || — || align=right | 4.4 km || 
|-id=714 bgcolor=#E9E9E9
| 6714 Montréal ||  ||  || July 29, 1990 || Palomar || H. E. Holt || — || align=right | 9.5 km || 
|-id=715 bgcolor=#E9E9E9
| 6715 Sheldonmarks ||  ||  || August 22, 1990 || Palomar || H. E. Holt, D. H. Levy || — || align=right | 9.3 km || 
|-id=716 bgcolor=#E9E9E9
| 6716 ||  || — || September 14, 1990 || Palomar || H. E. Holt || HOF || align=right | 16 km || 
|-id=717 bgcolor=#E9E9E9
| 6717 Antal ||  ||  || October 10, 1990 || Tautenburg Observatory || F. Börngen, L. D. Schmadel || DOR || align=right | 10 km || 
|-id=718 bgcolor=#d6d6d6
| 6718 Beiglböck ||  ||  || October 14, 1990 || Tautenburg Observatory || L. D. Schmadel, F. Börngen || KOR || align=right | 9.1 km || 
|-id=719 bgcolor=#E9E9E9
| 6719 Gallaj ||  ||  || October 16, 1990 || Nauchnij || L. V. Zhuravleva, G. R. Kastelʹ || HEN || align=right | 8.1 km || 
|-id=720 bgcolor=#d6d6d6
| 6720 Gifu ||  ||  || November 11, 1990 || Geisei || T. Seki || — || align=right | 21 km || 
|-id=721 bgcolor=#d6d6d6
| 6721 Minamiawaji ||  ||  || November 10, 1990 || Oohira || T. Urata || — || align=right | 15 km || 
|-id=722 bgcolor=#d6d6d6
| 6722 Bunichi ||  ||  || January 23, 1991 || Kitami || K. Endate, K. Watanabe || — || align=right | 15 km || 
|-id=723 bgcolor=#d6d6d6
| 6723 Chrisclark ||  ||  || February 14, 1991 || Palomar || E. F. Helin || — || align=right | 19 km || 
|-id=724 bgcolor=#d6d6d6
| 6724 ||  || — || February 4, 1991 || Kushiro || S. Ueda, H. Kaneda || — || align=right | 21 km || 
|-id=725 bgcolor=#d6d6d6
| 6725 Engyoji || 1991 DS ||  || February 21, 1991 || Karasuyama || S. Inoda, T. Urata || THM || align=right | 15 km || 
|-id=726 bgcolor=#fefefe
| 6726 Suthers || 1991 PS ||  || August 5, 1991 || Palomar || H. E. Holt || — || align=right | 3.5 km || 
|-id=727 bgcolor=#E9E9E9
| 6727 ||  || — || October 10, 1991 || Palomar || K. J. Lawrence || — || align=right | 8.9 km || 
|-id=728 bgcolor=#fefefe
| 6728 || 1991 UM || — || October 18, 1991 || Kushiro || S. Ueda, H. Kaneda || — || align=right | 2.8 km || 
|-id=729 bgcolor=#E9E9E9
| 6729 Emiko ||  ||  || November 4, 1991 || Kiyosato || S. Otomo || — || align=right | 9.4 km || 
|-id=730 bgcolor=#d6d6d6
| 6730 Ikeda || 1992 BH ||  || January 24, 1992 || Oohira || T. Urata || TIR || align=right | 9.1 km || 
|-id=731 bgcolor=#E9E9E9
| 6731 Hiei || 1992 BK ||  || January 24, 1992 || Yatsugatake || Y. Kushida, O. Muramatsu || — || align=right | 8.0 km || 
|-id=732 bgcolor=#d6d6d6
| 6732 ||  || — || February 8, 1992 || Kushiro || S. Ueda, H. Kaneda || — || align=right | 13 km || 
|-id=733 bgcolor=#d6d6d6
| 6733 || 1992 EF || — || March 2, 1992 || Kushiro || S. Ueda, H. Kaneda || EOS || align=right | 13 km || 
|-id=734 bgcolor=#d6d6d6
| 6734 Benzenberg || 1992 FB ||  || March 23, 1992 || Kushiro || S. Ueda, H. Kaneda || EOSslow || align=right | 14 km || 
|-id=735 bgcolor=#fefefe
| 6735 Madhatter ||  ||  || November 23, 1992 || Oohira || T. Urata || — || align=right | 4.6 km || 
|-id=736 bgcolor=#fefefe
| 6736 Marchare || 1993 EF ||  || March 1, 1993 || Oohira || T. Urata || NYS || align=right | 3.3 km || 
|-id=737 bgcolor=#fefefe
| 6737 Okabayashi || 1993 ER ||  || March 15, 1993 || Kitami || K. Endate, K. Watanabe || — || align=right | 4.6 km || 
|-id=738 bgcolor=#fefefe
| 6738 Tanabe ||  ||  || March 20, 1993 || Kitami || K. Endate, K. Watanabe || EUT || align=right | 3.1 km || 
|-id=739 bgcolor=#d6d6d6
| 6739 Tärendö ||  ||  || March 19, 1993 || La Silla || UESAC || THM || align=right | 14 km || 
|-id=740 bgcolor=#E9E9E9
| 6740 Goff || 1993 GY ||  || April 14, 1993 || Palomar || C. S. Shoemaker, E. M. Shoemaker || — || align=right | 6.7 km || 
|-id=741 bgcolor=#fefefe
| 6741 Liyuan || 1994 FX ||  || March 31, 1994 || Kitami || K. Endate, K. Watanabe || FLO || align=right | 4.6 km || 
|-id=742 bgcolor=#fefefe
| 6742 Biandepei || 1994 GR ||  || April 8, 1994 || Kitami || K. Endate, K. Watanabe || — || align=right | 5.4 km || 
|-id=743 bgcolor=#fefefe
| 6743 Liu || 1994 GS ||  || April 8, 1994 || Kitami || K. Endate, K. Watanabe || — || align=right | 5.3 km || 
|-id=744 bgcolor=#fefefe
| 6744 Komoda || 1994 JL ||  || May 6, 1994 || Kitami || K. Endate, K. Watanabe || — || align=right | 4.0 km || 
|-id=745 bgcolor=#fefefe
| 6745 Nishiyama ||  ||  || May 7, 1994 || Kitami || K. Endate, K. Watanabe || — || align=right | 2.6 km || 
|-id=746 bgcolor=#E9E9E9
| 6746 Zagar || 1994 NP ||  || July 9, 1994 || Bologna || San Vittore Obs. || EUN || align=right | 7.7 km || 
|-id=747 bgcolor=#d6d6d6
| 6747 Ozegahara ||  ||  || October 20, 1995 || Oizumi || T. Kobayashi || — || align=right | 14 km || 
|-id=748 bgcolor=#fefefe
| 6748 Bratton ||  ||  || October 20, 1995 || Kitt Peak || Spacewatch || NYS || align=right | 11 km || 
|-id=749 bgcolor=#E9E9E9
| 6749 Ireentje || 7068 P-L ||  || October 17, 1960 || Palomar || PLS || — || align=right | 4.9 km || 
|-id=750 bgcolor=#d6d6d6
| 6750 Katgert || 1078 T-1 ||  || March 24, 1971 || Palomar || PLS || — || align=right | 9.9 km || 
|-id=751 bgcolor=#fefefe
| 6751 van Genderen || 1114 T-1 ||  || March 25, 1971 || Palomar || PLS || — || align=right | 4.1 km || 
|-id=752 bgcolor=#fefefe
| 6752 Ashley || 4150 T-1 ||  || March 26, 1971 || Palomar || PLS || — || align=right | 7.3 km || 
|-id=753 bgcolor=#fefefe
| 6753 Fursenko ||  ||  || September 14, 1974 || Nauchnij || N. S. Chernykh || FLO || align=right | 4.7 km || 
|-id=754 bgcolor=#fefefe
| 6754 Burdenko ||  ||  || October 28, 1976 || Nauchnij || L. V. Zhuravleva || NYS || align=right | 5.1 km || 
|-id=755 bgcolor=#fefefe
| 6755 Solovʹyanenko ||  ||  || December 16, 1976 || Nauchnij || L. I. Chernykh || — || align=right | 7.1 km || 
|-id=756 bgcolor=#E9E9E9
| 6756 Williamfeldman ||  ||  || November 7, 1978 || Palomar || E. F. Helin, S. J. Bus || — || align=right | 3.9 km || 
|-id=757 bgcolor=#d6d6d6
| 6757 Addibischoff ||  ||  || September 20, 1979 || Palomar || S. J. Bus || KOR || align=right | 6.7 km || 
|-id=758 bgcolor=#E9E9E9
| 6758 Jesseowens || 1980 GL ||  || April 13, 1980 || Kleť || A. Mrkos || ADE || align=right | 12 km || 
|-id=759 bgcolor=#d6d6d6
| 6759 || 1980 KD || — || May 21, 1980 || La Silla || H. Debehogne || — || align=right | 19 km || 
|-id=760 bgcolor=#E9E9E9
| 6760 || 1980 KM || — || May 22, 1980 || La Silla || H. Debehogne || — || align=right | 7.5 km || 
|-id=761 bgcolor=#d6d6d6
| 6761 Haroldconnolly ||  ||  || March 2, 1981 || Siding Spring || S. J. Bus || — || align=right | 7.5 km || 
|-id=762 bgcolor=#fefefe
| 6762 Cyrenagoodrich ||  ||  || March 2, 1981 || Siding Spring || S. J. Bus || — || align=right | 3.7 km || 
|-id=763 bgcolor=#E9E9E9
| 6763 Kochiny ||  ||  || September 7, 1981 || Nauchnij || L. G. Karachkina || — || align=right | 7.1 km || 
|-id=764 bgcolor=#fefefe
| 6764 Kirillavrov ||  ||  || October 7, 1981 || Nauchnij || L. I. Chernykh || — || align=right | 5.3 km || 
|-id=765 bgcolor=#fefefe
| 6765 Fibonacci ||  ||  || January 20, 1982 || Kleť || L. Brožek || — || align=right | 7.4 km || 
|-id=766 bgcolor=#E9E9E9
| 6766 Kharms ||  ||  || October 20, 1982 || Nauchnij || L. G. Karachkina || — || align=right | 5.8 km || 
|-id=767 bgcolor=#E9E9E9
| 6767 Shirvindt ||  ||  || January 6, 1983 || Nauchnij || L. G. Karachkina || — || align=right | 6.4 km || 
|-id=768 bgcolor=#fefefe
| 6768 Mathiasbraun || 1983 RY ||  || September 7, 1983 || Kleť || A. Mrkos || NYS || align=right | 9.5 km || 
|-id=769 bgcolor=#fefefe
| 6769 Brokoff ||  ||  || February 15, 1985 || Kleť || A. Mrkos || NYS || align=right | 9.7 km || 
|-id=770 bgcolor=#d6d6d6
| 6770 Fugate || 1985 QR ||  || August 22, 1985 || Anderson Mesa || E. Bowell || — || align=right | 10 km || 
|-id=771 bgcolor=#fefefe
| 6771 Foerster ||  ||  || March 9, 1986 || Siding Spring || C.-I. Lagerkvist || — || align=right | 3.1 km || 
|-id=772 bgcolor=#E9E9E9
| 6772 ||  || — || January 20, 1988 || La Silla || H. Debehogne || — || align=right | 6.6 km || 
|-id=773 bgcolor=#d6d6d6
| 6773 Kellaway || 1988 LK ||  || June 15, 1988 || Palomar || E. F. Helin || EOS || align=right | 9.1 km || 
|-id=774 bgcolor=#fefefe
| 6774 Vladheinrich ||  ||  || November 4, 1988 || Kleť || A. Mrkos || — || align=right | 3.5 km || 
|-id=775 bgcolor=#E9E9E9
| 6775 Giorgini || 1989 GJ ||  || April 5, 1989 || Palomar || E. F. Helin || EUN || align=right | 5.9 km || 
|-id=776 bgcolor=#E9E9E9
| 6776 Dix ||  ||  || April 6, 1989 || Tautenburg Observatory || F. Börngen || — || align=right | 5.0 km || 
|-id=777 bgcolor=#d6d6d6
| 6777 Balakirev ||  ||  || September 26, 1989 || La Silla || E. W. Elst || THM || align=right | 12 km || 
|-id=778 bgcolor=#d6d6d6
| 6778 Tosamakoto ||  ||  || October 4, 1989 || Kitami || A. Takahashi, K. Watanabe || KOR || align=right | 7.8 km || 
|-id=779 bgcolor=#fefefe
| 6779 Perrine ||  ||  || February 20, 1990 || Kleť || A. Mrkos || — || align=right | 4.2 km || 
|-id=780 bgcolor=#fefefe
| 6780 Borodin ||  ||  || March 2, 1990 || La Silla || E. W. Elst || FLO || align=right | 4.0 km || 
|-id=781 bgcolor=#E9E9E9
| 6781 Sheikhumarrkhan || 1990 OD ||  || July 19, 1990 || Palomar || H. E. Holt || JUN || align=right | 9.2 km || 
|-id=782 bgcolor=#E9E9E9
| 6782 ||  || — || September 16, 1990 || Palomar || H. E. Holt || HOF || align=right | 15 km || 
|-id=783 bgcolor=#E9E9E9
| 6783 Gulyaev ||  ||  || September 24, 1990 || Nauchnij || L. I. Chernykh || — || align=right | 6.3 km || 
|-id=784 bgcolor=#E9E9E9
| 6784 Bogatikov ||  ||  || October 28, 1990 || Nauchnij || L. I. Chernykh || AGN || align=right | 6.2 km || 
|-id=785 bgcolor=#d6d6d6
| 6785 ||  || — || November 12, 1990 || Fujieda || H. Shiozawa, M. Kizawa || — || align=right | 28 km || 
|-id=786 bgcolor=#d6d6d6
| 6786 Doudantsutsuji || 1991 DT ||  || February 21, 1991 || Karasuyama || S. Inoda, T. Urata || THM || align=right | 13 km || 
|-id=787 bgcolor=#fefefe
| 6787 ||  || — || August 7, 1991 || Palomar || H. E. Holt || FLO || align=right | 4.9 km || 
|-id=788 bgcolor=#fefefe
| 6788 ||  || — || August 7, 1991 || Palomar || H. E. Holt || EUT || align=right | 4.0 km || 
|-id=789 bgcolor=#fefefe
| 6789 Milkey ||  ||  || September 4, 1991 || Palomar || E. F. Helin || FLO || align=right | 4.0 km || 
|-id=790 bgcolor=#fefefe
| 6790 Pingouin ||  ||  || September 28, 1991 || Kiyosato || S. Otomo || — || align=right | 4.8 km || 
|-id=791 bgcolor=#fefefe
| 6791 ||  || — || October 29, 1991 || Kushiro || S. Ueda, H. Kaneda || — || align=right | 5.4 km || 
|-id=792 bgcolor=#fefefe
| 6792 Akiyamatakashi || 1991 WC ||  || November 30, 1991 || Susono || M. Akiyama, T. Furuta || NYS || align=right | 5.6 km || 
|-id=793 bgcolor=#E9E9E9
| 6793 Palazzolo || 1991 YE ||  || December 30, 1991 || Bassano Bresciano || Bassano Bresciano Obs. || VIB || align=right | 9.9 km || 
|-id=794 bgcolor=#d6d6d6
| 6794 Masuisakura || 1992 DK ||  || February 26, 1992 || Dynic || A. Sugie || MEL || align=right | 27 km || 
|-id=795 bgcolor=#E9E9E9
| 6795 Örnsköldsvik ||  ||  || March 17, 1993 || La Silla || UESAC || — || align=right | 6.1 km || 
|-id=796 bgcolor=#E9E9E9
| 6796 Sundsvall ||  ||  || March 21, 1993 || La Silla || UESAC || PAD || align=right | 11 km || 
|-id=797 bgcolor=#d6d6d6
| 6797 Östersund ||  ||  || March 21, 1993 || La Silla || UESAC || KOR || align=right | 11 km || 
|-id=798 bgcolor=#d6d6d6
| 6798 Couperin ||  ||  || May 14, 1993 || La Silla || E. W. Elst || KOR || align=right | 9.7 km || 
|-id=799 bgcolor=#d6d6d6
| 6799 Citfiftythree || 1993 KM ||  || May 17, 1993 || Palomar || E. F. Helin || — || align=right | 9.2 km || 
|-id=800 bgcolor=#E9E9E9
| 6800 Saragamine || 1994 UC ||  || October 29, 1994 || Kuma Kogen || A. Nakamura || — || align=right | 13 km || 
|}

6801–6900 

|-bgcolor=#fefefe
| 6801 Střekov ||  ||  || October 22, 1995 || Kleť || Z. Moravec || — || align=right | 4.9 km || 
|-id=802 bgcolor=#d6d6d6
| 6802 Černovice ||  ||  || October 24, 1995 || Kleť || M. Tichý || — || align=right | 11 km || 
|-id=803 bgcolor=#E9E9E9
| 6803 ||  || — || October 27, 1995 || Kushiro || S. Ueda, H. Kaneda || — || align=right | 4.8 km || 
|-id=804 bgcolor=#fefefe
| 6804 Maruseppu || 1995 WV ||  || November 16, 1995 || Kuma Kogen || A. Nakamura || — || align=right | 4.7 km || 
|-id=805 bgcolor=#d6d6d6
| 6805 Abstracta || 4600 P-L ||  || September 24, 1960 || Palomar || PLS || THMslow || align=right | 12 km || 
|-id=806 bgcolor=#fefefe
| 6806 Kaufmann || 6048 P-L ||  || September 24, 1960 || Palomar || PLS || SUL || align=right | 9.0 km || 
|-id=807 bgcolor=#fefefe
| 6807 Brünnow || 6568 P-L ||  || September 24, 1960 || Palomar || PLS || FLO || align=right | 3.1 km || 
|-id=808 bgcolor=#fefefe
| 6808 Plantin || 1932 CP ||  || February 5, 1932 || Heidelberg || K. Reinmuth || — || align=right | 5.4 km || 
|-id=809 bgcolor=#fefefe
| 6809 Sakuma ||  ||  || February 20, 1938 || Heidelberg || K. Reinmuth || — || align=right | 5.6 km || 
|-id=810 bgcolor=#d6d6d6
| 6810 Juanclariá || 1969 GC ||  || April 9, 1969 || El Leoncito || Félix Aguilar Obs. || — || align=right | 13 km || 
|-id=811 bgcolor=#fefefe
| 6811 Kashcheev || 1976 QP ||  || August 26, 1976 || Nauchnij || N. S. Chernykh || NYS || align=right | 3.0 km || 
|-id=812 bgcolor=#d6d6d6
| 6812 Robertnelson ||  ||  || November 7, 1978 || Palomar || E. F. Helin, S. J. Bus || THM || align=right | 9.2 km || 
|-id=813 bgcolor=#d6d6d6
| 6813 Amandahendrix ||  ||  || November 7, 1978 || Palomar || E. F. Helin, S. J. Bus || — || align=right | 13 km || 
|-id=814 bgcolor=#d6d6d6
| 6814 Steffl ||  ||  || June 25, 1979 || Siding Spring || E. F. Helin, S. J. Bus || — || align=right | 6.8 km || 
|-id=815 bgcolor=#fefefe
| 6815 Mutchler ||  ||  || June 25, 1979 || Siding Spring || E. F. Helin, S. J. Bus || NYS || align=right | 2.8 km || 
|-id=816 bgcolor=#fefefe
| 6816 Barbcohen ||  ||  || March 2, 1981 || Siding Spring || S. J. Bus || — || align=right | 3.0 km || 
|-id=817 bgcolor=#fefefe
| 6817 Pest ||  ||  || January 20, 1982 || Kleť || A. Mrkos || — || align=right | 4.2 km || 
|-id=818 bgcolor=#fefefe
| 6818 Sessyu ||  ||  || March 11, 1983 || Kiso || H. Kosai, K. Furukawa || FLO || align=right | 5.0 km || 
|-id=819 bgcolor=#fefefe
| 6819 McGarvey || 1983 LL ||  || June 14, 1983 || Palomar || S. Smrekar || — || align=right | 4.7 km || 
|-id=820 bgcolor=#d6d6d6
| 6820 Buil || 1985 XS ||  || December 13, 1985 || Caussols || CERGA || KOR || align=right | 7.9 km || 
|-id=821 bgcolor=#E9E9E9
| 6821 Ranevskaya ||  ||  || September 29, 1986 || Nauchnij || L. G. Karachkina || — || align=right | 8.4 km || 
|-id=822 bgcolor=#E9E9E9
| 6822 Horálek || 1986 UO ||  || October 28, 1986 || Kleť || Z. Vávrová || — || align=right | 5.3 km || 
|-id=823 bgcolor=#E9E9E9
| 6823 ||  || — || March 12, 1988 || Yorii || M. Arai, H. Mori || — || align=right | 9.3 km || 
|-id=824 bgcolor=#d6d6d6
| 6824 Mallory ||  ||  || September 8, 1988 || Kleť || A. Mrkos || THM || align=right | 15 km || 
|-id=825 bgcolor=#fefefe
| 6825 Irvine ||  ||  || October 4, 1988 || Kleť || A. Mrkos || — || align=right | 4.7 km || 
|-id=826 bgcolor=#d6d6d6
| 6826 Lavoisier ||  ||  || September 26, 1989 || La Silla || E. W. Elst || KOR || align=right | 6.5 km || 
|-id=827 bgcolor=#E9E9E9
| 6827 Wombat ||  ||  || September 27, 1990 || Oohira || T. Urata || EUN || align=right | 7.8 km || 
|-id=828 bgcolor=#E9E9E9
| 6828 Elbsteel ||  ||  || November 12, 1990 || Siding Spring || D. I. Steel || — || align=right | 6.8 km || 
|-id=829 bgcolor=#d6d6d6
| 6829 Charmawidor ||  ||  || January 18, 1991 || Haute-Provence || E. W. Elst || KOR || align=right | 7.3 km || 
|-id=830 bgcolor=#d6d6d6
| 6830 Johnbackus ||  ||  || May 5, 1991 || Kiyosato || S. Otomo, O. Muramatsu || — || align=right | 15 km || 
|-id=831 bgcolor=#fefefe
| 6831 ||  || — || October 28, 1991 || Kushiro || S. Ueda, H. Kaneda || FLO || align=right | 4.4 km || 
|-id=832 bgcolor=#d6d6d6
| 6832 Kawabata || 1992 FP ||  || March 23, 1992 || Kitami || K. Endate, K. Watanabe || — || align=right | 12 km || 
|-id=833 bgcolor=#E9E9E9
| 6833 ||  || — || March 19, 1993 || Hidaka || S. Shirai, S. Hayakawa || EUN || align=right | 6.5 km || 
|-id=834 bgcolor=#fefefe
| 6834 Hunfeld || 1993 JH ||  || May 11, 1993 || Nachi-Katsuura || Y. Shimizu, T. Urata || — || align=right | 9.7 km || 
|-id=835 bgcolor=#E9E9E9
| 6835 Molfino ||  ||  || April 30, 1994 || Stroncone || Santa Lucia Obs. || — || align=right | 4.0 km || 
|-id=836 bgcolor=#d6d6d6
| 6836 Paranal ||  ||  || August 10, 1994 || La Silla || E. W. Elst || KOR || align=right | 7.8 km || 
|-id=837 bgcolor=#d6d6d6
| 6837 Bressi ||  ||  || December 8, 1994 || Kitt Peak || Spacewatch || — || align=right | 8.3 km || 
|-id=838 bgcolor=#E9E9E9
| 6838 Okuda ||  ||  || October 30, 1995 || Nachi-Katsuura || Y. Shimizu, T. Urata || — || align=right | 11 km || 
|-id=839 bgcolor=#d6d6d6
| 6839 Ozenuma ||  ||  || November 18, 1995 || Oizumi || T. Kobayashi || KOR || align=right | 12 km || 
|-id=840 bgcolor=#fefefe
| 6840 ||  || — || November 18, 1995 || Kushiro || S. Ueda, H. Kaneda || NYSslow || align=right | 8.6 km || 
|-id=841 bgcolor=#fefefe
| 6841 Gottfriedkirch || 2034 P-L ||  || September 24, 1960 || Palomar || PLS || — || align=right | 3.8 km || 
|-id=842 bgcolor=#E9E9E9
| 6842 Krosigk || 3016 P-L ||  || September 24, 1960 || Palomar || PLS || — || align=right | 5.8 km || 
|-id=843 bgcolor=#fefefe
| 6843 Heremon ||  ||  || October 9, 1975 || McDonald || J.-D. Mulholland || — || align=right | 5.2 km || 
|-id=844 bgcolor=#fefefe
| 6844 Shpak ||  ||  || November 3, 1975 || Nauchnij || T. M. Smirnova || — || align=right | 4.2 km || 
|-id=845 bgcolor=#fefefe
| 6845 Mansurova ||  ||  || May 2, 1976 || Nauchnij || N. S. Chernykh || FLO || align=right | 4.8 km || 
|-id=846 bgcolor=#fefefe
| 6846 Kansazan ||  ||  || October 22, 1976 || Kiso || H. Kosai, K. Furukawa || NYS || align=right | 3.3 km || 
|-id=847 bgcolor=#FA8072
| 6847 Kunz-Hallstein || 1977 RL ||  || September 5, 1977 || La Silla || H.-E. Schuster || PHO || align=right | 3.7 km || 
|-id=848 bgcolor=#d6d6d6
| 6848 Casely-Hayford ||  ||  || November 7, 1978 || Palomar || E. F. Helin, S. J. Bus || THM || align=right | 11 km || 
|-id=849 bgcolor=#fefefe
| 6849 Doloreshuerta ||  ||  || June 25, 1979 || Siding Spring || E. F. Helin, S. J. Bus || V || align=right | 4.1 km || 
|-id=850 bgcolor=#d6d6d6
| 6850 ||  || — || August 28, 1981 || La Silla || H. Debehogne || — || align=right | 22 km || 
|-id=851 bgcolor=#fefefe
| 6851 Chianti ||  ||  || September 1, 1981 || La Silla || H. Debehogne || — || align=right | 2.8 km || 
|-id=852 bgcolor=#fefefe
| 6852 Nannibignami ||  ||  || February 14, 1985 || La Silla || H. Debehogne || NYS || align=right | 4.2 km || 
|-id=853 bgcolor=#fefefe
| 6853 Silvanomassaglia ||  ||  || February 12, 1986 || La Silla || H. Debehogne || FLO || align=right | 3.4 km || 
|-id=854 bgcolor=#fefefe
| 6854 Georgewest || 1987 UG ||  || October 20, 1987 || Anderson Mesa || K. W. Zeigler || NYS || align=right | 4.2 km || 
|-id=855 bgcolor=#fefefe
| 6855 Armellini || 1989 BG ||  || January 29, 1989 || Bologna || San Vittore Obs. || — || align=right | 6.7 km || 
|-id=856 bgcolor=#fefefe
| 6856 Bethemmons || 1989 EM ||  || March 5, 1989 || Palomar || E. F. Helin || NYS || align=right | 3.9 km || 
|-id=857 bgcolor=#fefefe
| 6857 Castelli || 1990 QQ ||  || August 19, 1990 || Palomar || E. F. Helin || KLI || align=right | 8.3 km || 
|-id=858 bgcolor=#E9E9E9
| 6858 ||  || — || September 16, 1990 || Palomar || H. E. Holt || — || align=right | 6.4 km || 
|-id=859 bgcolor=#fefefe
| 6859 Datemasamune || 1991 CZ ||  || February 13, 1991 || Ayashi Station || M. Koishikawa || H || align=right | 3.8 km || 
|-id=860 bgcolor=#d6d6d6
| 6860 Sims ||  ||  || February 11, 1991 || Kiyosato || S. Otomo, O. Muramatsu || THM || align=right | 11 km || 
|-id=861 bgcolor=#d6d6d6
| 6861 ||  || — || March 20, 1991 || La Silla || H. Debehogne || — || align=right | 18 km || 
|-id=862 bgcolor=#d6d6d6
| 6862 Virgiliomarcon || 1991 GL ||  || April 11, 1991 || Bologna || San Vittore Obs. || — || align=right | 23 km || 
|-id=863 bgcolor=#fefefe
| 6863 ||  || — || August 5, 1991 || Palomar || H. E. Holt || — || align=right | 3.8 km || 
|-id=864 bgcolor=#fefefe
| 6864 Starkenburg ||  ||  || September 12, 1991 || Tautenburg Observatory || F. Börngen, L. D. Schmadel || FLO || align=right | 3.4 km || 
|-id=865 bgcolor=#fefefe
| 6865 Dunkerley ||  ||  || October 2, 1991 || Yatsugatake || Y. Kushida, O. Muramatsu || — || align=right | 3.3 km || 
|-id=866 bgcolor=#d6d6d6
| 6866 Kukai || 1992 CO ||  || February 12, 1992 || Kiyosato || S. Otomo || EOS || align=right | 13 km || 
|-id=867 bgcolor=#E9E9E9
| 6867 Kuwano ||  ||  || March 28, 1992 || Kitami || K. Endate, K. Watanabe || — || align=right | 6.7 km || 
|-id=868 bgcolor=#E9E9E9
| 6868 Seiyauyeda || 1992 HD ||  || April 22, 1992 || Yatsugatake || Y. Kushida, O. Muramatsu || — || align=right | 14 km || 
|-id=869 bgcolor=#d6d6d6
| 6869 Funada || 1992 JP ||  || May 2, 1992 || Kitami || K. Endate, K. Watanabe || URS || align=right | 23 km || 
|-id=870 bgcolor=#fefefe
| 6870 Pauldavies || 1992 OG ||  || July 28, 1992 || Siding Spring || R. H. McNaught || H || align=right | 2.5 km || 
|-id=871 bgcolor=#fefefe
| 6871 Verlaine ||  ||  || January 23, 1993 || La Silla || E. W. Elst || — || align=right | 2.7 km || 
|-id=872 bgcolor=#fefefe
| 6872 ||  || — || February 15, 1993 || Kushiro || S. Ueda, H. Kaneda || — || align=right | 4.4 km || 
|-id=873 bgcolor=#fefefe
| 6873 Tasaka ||  ||  || April 21, 1993 || Kitami || K. Endate, K. Watanabe || FLO || align=right | 3.9 km || 
|-id=874 bgcolor=#FA8072
| 6874 ||  || — || May 9, 1994 || Siding Spring || G. J. Garradd || — || align=right | 5.0 km || 
|-id=875 bgcolor=#fefefe
| 6875 Golgi ||  ||  || July 4, 1994 || Palomar || E. F. Helin || — || align=right | 4.2 km || 
|-id=876 bgcolor=#fefefe
| 6876 Beppeforti ||  ||  || September 5, 1994 || Cima Ekar || A. Boattini, M. Tombelli || V || align=right | 4.2 km || 
|-id=877 bgcolor=#fefefe
| 6877 Giada ||  ||  || October 10, 1994 || Colleverde || V. S. Casulli || V || align=right | 4.7 km || 
|-id=878 bgcolor=#fefefe
| 6878 Isamu ||  ||  || October 2, 1994 || Kitami || K. Endate, K. Watanabe || NYS || align=right | 8.2 km || 
|-id=879 bgcolor=#d6d6d6
| 6879 Hyogo ||  ||  || October 14, 1994 || Sengamine || K. Itō || — || align=right | 19 km || 
|-id=880 bgcolor=#E9E9E9
| 6880 Hayamiyu ||  ||  || October 13, 1994 || Kiyosato || S. Otomo || — || align=right | 9.4 km || 
|-id=881 bgcolor=#d6d6d6
| 6881 Shifutsu || 1994 UP ||  || October 31, 1994 || Oizumi || T. Kobayashi || KOR || align=right | 6.0 km || 
|-id=882 bgcolor=#E9E9E9
| 6882 Sormano ||  ||  || February 5, 1995 || Sormano || P. Sicoli, V. Giuliani || MAR || align=right | 8.1 km || 
|-id=883 bgcolor=#d6d6d6
| 6883 Hiuchigatake || 1996 AF ||  || January 10, 1996 || Oizumi || T. Kobayashi || THM || align=right | 13 km || 
|-id=884 bgcolor=#fefefe
| 6884 Takeshisato || 9521 P-L ||  || October 17, 1960 || Palomar || PLS || — || align=right | 3.3 km || 
|-id=885 bgcolor=#E9E9E9
| 6885 Nitardy || 9570 P-L ||  || October 17, 1960 || Palomar || PLS || HEN || align=right | 3.2 km || 
|-id=886 bgcolor=#E9E9E9
| 6886 Grote || 1942 CG ||  || February 11, 1942 || Turku || L. Oterma || RAF || align=right | 8.4 km || 
|-id=887 bgcolor=#fefefe
| 6887 Hasuo || 1951 WH ||  || November 24, 1951 || Nice || M. Laugier || FLO || align=right | 4.3 km || 
|-id=888 bgcolor=#E9E9E9
| 6888 ||  || — || January 27, 1971 || Cerro El Roble || C. Torres, J.-M. Petit || — || align=right | 5.7 km || 
|-id=889 bgcolor=#fefefe
| 6889 || 1971 RA || — || September 15, 1971 || Cerro El Roble || C. Torres, J.-M. Petit || FLO || align=right | 3.9 km || 
|-id=890 bgcolor=#d6d6d6
| 6890 Savinykh || 1975 RP ||  || September 3, 1975 || Nauchnij || L. I. Chernykh || THM || align=right | 19 km || 
|-id=891 bgcolor=#E9E9E9
| 6891 Triconia || 1976 SA ||  || September 23, 1976 || Harvard Observatory || Harvard Obs. || — || align=right | 8.3 km || 
|-id=892 bgcolor=#E9E9E9
| 6892 Lana ||  ||  || November 7, 1978 || Palomar || E. F. Helin, S. J. Bus || — || align=right | 2.7 km || 
|-id=893 bgcolor=#fefefe
| 6893 Sanderson ||  ||  || September 2, 1983 || La Silla || H. Debehogne || V || align=right | 3.9 km || 
|-id=894 bgcolor=#E9E9E9
| 6894 Macreid ||  ||  || September 5, 1986 || Palomar || E. F. Helin || HNS || align=right | 7.7 km || 
|-id=895 bgcolor=#E9E9E9
| 6895 ||  || — || February 23, 1987 || La Silla || H. Debehogne || MIS || align=right | 14 km || 
|-id=896 bgcolor=#fefefe
| 6896 ||  || — || September 13, 1987 || La Silla || H. Debehogne || — || align=right | 4.2 km || 
|-id=897 bgcolor=#fefefe
| 6897 Tabei || 1987 VQ ||  || November 15, 1987 || Kleť || A. Mrkos || NYS || align=right | 4.5 km || 
|-id=898 bgcolor=#E9E9E9
| 6898 Saint-Marys || 1988 LE ||  || June 8, 1988 || Palomar || C. S. Shoemaker || EUN || align=right | 8.4 km || 
|-id=899 bgcolor=#d6d6d6
| 6899 Nancychabot ||  ||  || September 14, 1988 || Cerro Tololo || S. J. Bus || — || align=right | 6.3 km || 
|-id=900 bgcolor=#fefefe
| 6900 ||  || — || December 2, 1988 || Yorii || M. Arai, H. Mori || — || align=right | 3.3 km || 
|}

6901–7000 

|-bgcolor=#fefefe
| 6901 Roybishop || 1989 PA ||  || August 2, 1989 || Palomar || C. S. Shoemaker, E. M. Shoemaker || H || align=right | 5.1 km || 
|-id=902 bgcolor=#E9E9E9
| 6902 Hideoasada ||  ||  || October 26, 1989 || Kani || Y. Mizuno, T. Furuta || — || align=right | 13 km || 
|-id=903 bgcolor=#d6d6d6
| 6903 || 1989 XM || — || December 2, 1989 || Gekko || Y. Oshima || — || align=right | 7.9 km || 
|-id=904 bgcolor=#fefefe
| 6904 McGill ||  ||  || August 22, 1990 || Palomar || H. E. Holt || V || align=right | 3.1 km || 
|-id=905 bgcolor=#E9E9E9
| 6905 Miyazaki || 1990 TW ||  || October 15, 1990 || Kitami || K. Endate, K. Watanabe || EUN || align=right | 13 km || 
|-id=906 bgcolor=#E9E9E9
| 6906 Johnmills || 1990 WC ||  || November 19, 1990 || Siding Spring || R. H. McNaught || CLO || align=right | 11 km || 
|-id=907 bgcolor=#E9E9E9
| 6907 Harryford || 1990 WE ||  || November 19, 1990 || Siding Spring || R. H. McNaught || — || align=right | 12 km || 
|-id=908 bgcolor=#E9E9E9
| 6908 Kunimoto ||  ||  || November 24, 1990 || Kitami || K. Endate, K. Watanabe || — || align=right | 6.4 km || 
|-id=909 bgcolor=#FA8072
| 6909 Levison ||  ||  || January 19, 1991 || Palomar || C. S. Shoemaker, E. M. Shoemaker || Tj (2.92) || align=right | 9.2 km || 
|-id=910 bgcolor=#d6d6d6
| 6910 Ikeguchi || 1991 FJ ||  || March 17, 1991 || Kiyosato || S. Otomo, O. Muramatsu || EOS || align=right | 12 km || 
|-id=911 bgcolor=#fefefe
| 6911 Nancygreen || 1991 GN ||  || April 10, 1991 || Palomar || E. F. Helin || H || align=right | 2.5 km || 
|-id=912 bgcolor=#d6d6d6
| 6912 Grimm ||  ||  || April 8, 1991 || La Silla || E. W. Elst || — || align=right | 11 km || 
|-id=913 bgcolor=#fefefe
| 6913 Yukawa ||  ||  || October 31, 1991 || Kitami || K. Endate, K. Watanabe || — || align=right | 3.3 km || 
|-id=914 bgcolor=#E9E9E9
| 6914 Becquerel || 1992 GZ ||  || April 3, 1992 || Palomar || C. S. Shoemaker, D. H. Levy, H. E. Holt || — || align=right | 7.5 km || 
|-id=915 bgcolor=#E9E9E9
| 6915 || 1992 HH || — || April 30, 1992 || Yatsugatake || Y. Kushida, O. Muramatsu || — || align=right | 7.1 km || 
|-id=916 bgcolor=#d6d6d6
| 6916 Lewispearce || 1992 OJ ||  || July 27, 1992 || Siding Spring || R. H. McNaught || — || align=right | 12 km || 
|-id=917 bgcolor=#fefefe
| 6917 ||  || — || March 29, 1993 || Kiyosato || S. Otomo || FLO || align=right | 4.4 km || 
|-id=918 bgcolor=#fefefe
| 6918 Manaslu ||  ||  || March 20, 1993 || Nyukasa || M. Hirasawa, S. Suzuki || NYS || align=right | 5.2 km || 
|-id=919 bgcolor=#fefefe
| 6919 Tomonaga || 1993 HP ||  || April 16, 1993 || Kitami || K. Endate, K. Watanabe || FLO || align=right | 4.1 km || 
|-id=920 bgcolor=#fefefe
| 6920 Esaki || 1993 JE ||  || May 14, 1993 || Kitami || K. Endate, K. Watanabe || V || align=right | 5.0 km || 
|-id=921 bgcolor=#fefefe
| 6921 Janejacobs || 1993 JJ ||  || May 14, 1993 || Kushiro || S. Ueda, H. Kaneda || — || align=right | 5.3 km || 
|-id=922 bgcolor=#fefefe
| 6922 Yasushi ||  ||  || May 27, 1993 || Kiyosato || S. Otomo || FLO || align=right | 4.5 km || 
|-id=923 bgcolor=#d6d6d6
| 6923 Borzacchini || 1993 SD ||  || September 16, 1993 || Stroncone || Santa Lucia Obs. || — || align=right | 6.8 km || 
|-id=924 bgcolor=#d6d6d6
| 6924 Fukui || 1993 TP ||  || October 8, 1993 || Kitami || K. Endate, K. Watanabe || 7:4 || align=right | 30 km || 
|-id=925 bgcolor=#d6d6d6
| 6925 Susumu ||  ||  || October 24, 1993 || Geisei || T. Seki || — || align=right | 23 km || 
|-id=926 bgcolor=#E9E9E9
| 6926 ||  || — || September 1, 1994 || Kushiro || S. Ueda, H. Kaneda || EUN || align=right | 6.7 km || 
|-id=927 bgcolor=#fefefe
| 6927 Tonegawa ||  ||  || October 2, 1994 || Kitami || K. Endate, K. Watanabe || — || align=right | 6.2 km || 
|-id=928 bgcolor=#E9E9E9
| 6928 Lanna ||  ||  || October 11, 1994 || Kleť || M. Tichý || — || align=right | 6.7 km || 
|-id=929 bgcolor=#E9E9E9
| 6929 Misto || 1994 UE ||  || October 31, 1994 || Colleverde || V. S. Casulli || GEF || align=right | 7.3 km || 
|-id=930 bgcolor=#d6d6d6
| 6930 ||  || — || November 7, 1994 || Kushiro || S. Ueda, H. Kaneda || THM || align=right | 11 km || 
|-id=931 bgcolor=#d6d6d6
| 6931 Kenzaburo ||  ||  || November 4, 1994 || Kitami || K. Endate, K. Watanabe || — || align=right | 16 km || 
|-id=932 bgcolor=#fefefe
| 6932 Tanigawadake || 1994 YK ||  || December 24, 1994 || Oizumi || T. Kobayashi || — || align=right | 5.2 km || 
|-id=933 bgcolor=#E9E9E9
| 6933 Azumayasan || 1994 YW ||  || December 28, 1994 || Oizumi || T. Kobayashi || — || align=right | 12 km || 
|-id=934 bgcolor=#E9E9E9
| 6934 ||  || — || December 25, 1994 || Kushiro || S. Ueda, H. Kaneda || — || align=right | 12 km || 
|-id=935 bgcolor=#fefefe
| 6935 Morisot || 4524 P-L ||  || September 24, 1960 || Palomar || PLS || — || align=right | 3.6 km || 
|-id=936 bgcolor=#E9E9E9
| 6936 Cassatt || 6573 P-L ||  || September 24, 1960 || Palomar || PLS || — || align=right | 5.5 km || 
|-id=937 bgcolor=#d6d6d6
| 6937 Valadon || 1010 T-2 ||  || September 29, 1973 || Palomar || PLS || — || align=right | 11 km || 
|-id=938 bgcolor=#d6d6d6
| 6938 Soniaterk || 5140 T-2 ||  || September 25, 1973 || Palomar || PLS || EOS || align=right | 11 km || 
|-id=939 bgcolor=#E9E9E9
| 6939 Lestone ||  ||  || September 22, 1952 || Mount Wilson || L. E. Cunningham || EUN || align=right | 5.3 km || 
|-id=940 bgcolor=#fefefe
| 6940 ||  || — || April 19, 1972 || Cerro El Roble || C. Torres || NYS || align=right | 3.0 km || 
|-id=941 bgcolor=#E9E9E9
| 6941 Dalgarno || 1976 YA ||  || December 16, 1976 || Harvard Observatory || Harvard Obs. || — || align=right | 8.1 km || 
|-id=942 bgcolor=#fefefe
| 6942 Yurigulyaev ||  ||  || December 16, 1976 || Nauchnij || L. I. Chernykh || — || align=right | 6.0 km || 
|-id=943 bgcolor=#fefefe
| 6943 Moretto ||  ||  || November 7, 1978 || Palomar || E. F. Helin, S. J. Bus || — || align=right | 4.1 km || 
|-id=944 bgcolor=#fefefe
| 6944 Elaineowens ||  ||  || June 25, 1979 || Siding Spring || E. F. Helin, S. J. Bus || V || align=right | 3.4 km || 
|-id=945 bgcolor=#fefefe
| 6945 Dahlgren ||  ||  || March 16, 1980 || La Silla || C.-I. Lagerkvist || — || align=right | 4.1 km || 
|-id=946 bgcolor=#fefefe
| 6946 ||  || — || September 15, 1980 || La Silla || H. Debehogne, L. Houziaux || FLO || align=right | 4.9 km || 
|-id=947 bgcolor=#fefefe
| 6947 Andrewdavis ||  ||  || March 1, 1981 || Siding Spring || S. J. Bus || — || align=right | 3.8 km || 
|-id=948 bgcolor=#fefefe
| 6948 Gounelle ||  ||  || March 2, 1981 || Siding Spring || S. J. Bus || NYS || align=right | 3.6 km || 
|-id=949 bgcolor=#fefefe
| 6949 Zissell || 1982 RZ ||  || September 11, 1982 || Harvard Observatory || Oak Ridge Observatory || — || align=right | 8.2 km || 
|-id=950 bgcolor=#E9E9E9
| 6950 Simonek || 1982 YQ ||  || December 22, 1982 || Haute-Provence || F. Dossin || EUN || align=right | 7.4 km || 
|-id=951 bgcolor=#d6d6d6
| 6951 ||  || — || February 16, 1985 || La Silla || H. Debehogne || — || align=right | 13 km || 
|-id=952 bgcolor=#d6d6d6
| 6952 Niccolò || 1986 JT ||  || May 4, 1986 || Anderson Mesa || E. Bowell || — || align=right | 16 km || 
|-id=953 bgcolor=#d6d6d6
| 6953 Davepierce ||  ||  || August 1, 1986 || Palomar || E. F. Helin || THM || align=right | 16 km || 
|-id=954 bgcolor=#fefefe
| 6954 Potemkin ||  ||  || September 4, 1987 || Nauchnij || L. V. Zhuravleva || — || align=right | 4.1 km || 
|-id=955 bgcolor=#d6d6d6
| 6955 Ekaterina ||  ||  || September 25, 1987 || Nauchnij || L. V. Zhuravleva || THM || align=right | 16 km || 
|-id=956 bgcolor=#fefefe
| 6956 Holbach ||  ||  || February 13, 1988 || La Silla || E. W. Elst || V || align=right | 3.7 km || 
|-id=957 bgcolor=#E9E9E9
| 6957 || 1988 HA || — || April 16, 1988 || Kushiro || S. Ueda, H. Kaneda || — || align=right | 5.6 km || 
|-id=958 bgcolor=#d6d6d6
| 6958 ||  || — || October 13, 1988 || Kushiro || S. Ueda, H. Kaneda || EOS || align=right | 9.0 km || 
|-id=959 bgcolor=#d6d6d6
| 6959 Mikkelkocha ||  ||  || November 3, 1988 || Brorfelde || P. Jensen || — || align=right | 9.8 km || 
|-id=960 bgcolor=#d6d6d6
| 6960 ||  || — || January 4, 1989 || Siding Spring || R. H. McNaught || — || align=right | 16 km || 
|-id=961 bgcolor=#fefefe
| 6961 Ashitaka || 1989 KA ||  || May 26, 1989 || Mishima || M. Akiyama, T. Furuta || — || align=right | 4.6 km || 
|-id=962 bgcolor=#fefefe
| 6962 Summerscience || 1990 OT ||  || July 22, 1990 || Palomar || E. F. Helin || V || align=right | 3.7 km || 
|-id=963 bgcolor=#fefefe
| 6963 ||  || — || July 27, 1990 || Palomar || H. E. Holt || FLO || align=right | 4.6 km || 
|-id=964 bgcolor=#fefefe
| 6964 Kunihiko ||  ||  || October 15, 1990 || Kitami || K. Endate, K. Watanabe || — || align=right | 4.7 km || 
|-id=965 bgcolor=#fefefe
| 6965 Niyodogawa ||  ||  || November 11, 1990 || Geisei || T. Seki || — || align=right | 5.7 km || 
|-id=966 bgcolor=#fefefe
| 6966 Vietoris ||  ||  || September 13, 1991 || Tautenburg Observatory || L. D. Schmadel, F. Börngen || — || align=right | 3.4 km || 
|-id=967 bgcolor=#fefefe
| 6967 ||  || — || November 11, 1991 || Toyota || K. Suzuki, T. Urata || — || align=right | 4.4 km || 
|-id=968 bgcolor=#fefefe
| 6968 ||  || — || November 11, 1991 || Kushiro || S. Ueda, H. Kaneda || — || align=right | 4.2 km || 
|-id=969 bgcolor=#fefefe
| 6969 Santaro ||  ||  || November 4, 1991 || Kiyosato || S. Otomo || — || align=right | 6.2 km || 
|-id=970 bgcolor=#fefefe
| 6970 Saigusa ||  ||  || January 10, 1992 || Kiyosato || S. Otomo || V || align=right | 4.6 km || 
|-id=971 bgcolor=#d6d6d6
| 6971 Omogokei || 1992 CT ||  || February 8, 1992 || Geisei || T. Seki || KOR || align=right | 6.8 km || 
|-id=972 bgcolor=#E9E9E9
| 6972 Helvetius ||  ||  || April 4, 1992 || La Silla || E. W. Elst || — || align=right | 6.9 km || 
|-id=973 bgcolor=#E9E9E9
| 6973 Karajan || 1992 HK ||  || April 27, 1992 || Kushiro || S. Ueda, H. Kaneda || MIS || align=right | 7.8 km || 
|-id=974 bgcolor=#E9E9E9
| 6974 Solti || 1992 MC ||  || June 27, 1992 || Palomar || H. E. Holt || MAR || align=right | 9.8 km || 
|-id=975 bgcolor=#d6d6d6
| 6975 Hiroaki || 1992 QM ||  || August 25, 1992 || Kiyosato || S. Otomo || — || align=right | 18 km || 
|-id=976 bgcolor=#fefefe
| 6976 Kanatsu ||  ||  || May 23, 1993 || Kiyosato || S. Otomo || — || align=right | 5.5 km || 
|-id=977 bgcolor=#fefefe
| 6977 Jaucourt ||  ||  || July 20, 1993 || La Silla || E. W. Elst || — || align=right | 4.0 km || 
|-id=978 bgcolor=#E9E9E9
| 6978 Hironaka || 1993 RD ||  || September 12, 1993 || Kitami || K. Endate, K. Watanabe || RAF || align=right | 5.4 km || 
|-id=979 bgcolor=#E9E9E9
| 6979 Shigefumi || 1993 RH ||  || September 12, 1993 || Kitami || K. Endate, K. Watanabe || — || align=right | 8.2 km || 
|-id=980 bgcolor=#d6d6d6
| 6980 Kyusakamoto ||  ||  || September 16, 1993 || Kitami || K. Endate, K. Watanabe || KOR || align=right | 8.8 km || 
|-id=981 bgcolor=#E9E9E9
| 6981 Chirman ||  ||  || October 15, 1993 || Bassano Bresciano || Bassano Bresciano Obs. || EUN || align=right | 7.0 km || 
|-id=982 bgcolor=#E9E9E9
| 6982 Cesarchavez ||  ||  || October 16, 1993 || Palomar || E. F. Helin || EUN || align=right | 7.9 km || 
|-id=983 bgcolor=#d6d6d6
| 6983 Komatsusakyo || 1993 YC ||  || December 17, 1993 || Oizumi || T. Kobayashi || — || align=right | 27 km || 
|-id=984 bgcolor=#d6d6d6
| 6984 Lewiscarroll || 1994 AO ||  || January 4, 1994 || Fujieda || H. Shiozawa, T. Urata || 3:2 || align=right | 48 km || 
|-id=985 bgcolor=#fefefe
| 6985 ||  || — || October 31, 1994 || Kushiro || S. Ueda, H. Kaneda || V || align=right | 3.7 km || 
|-id=986 bgcolor=#d6d6d6
| 6986 Asamayama || 1994 WE ||  || November 24, 1994 || Oizumi || T. Kobayashi || KOR || align=right | 5.5 km || 
|-id=987 bgcolor=#E9E9E9
| 6987 Onioshidashi || 1994 WZ ||  || November 25, 1994 || Oizumi || T. Kobayashi || AGN || align=right | 5.7 km || 
|-id=988 bgcolor=#fefefe
| 6988 ||  || — || November 28, 1994 || Kushiro || S. Ueda, H. Kaneda || — || align=right | 5.5 km || 
|-id=989 bgcolor=#d6d6d6
| 6989 Hoshinosato ||  ||  || December 6, 1994 || Oizumi || T. Kobayashi || EOS || align=right | 10 km || 
|-id=990 bgcolor=#d6d6d6
| 6990 Toya ||  ||  || December 9, 1994 || Oizumi || T. Kobayashi || THM || align=right | 14 km || 
|-id=991 bgcolor=#fefefe
| 6991 Chichibu || 1995 AX ||  || January 6, 1995 || Oizumi || T. Kobayashi || — || align=right | 4.5 km || 
|-id=992 bgcolor=#d6d6d6
| 6992 Minano-machi ||  ||  || January 27, 1995 || Oizumi || T. Kobayashi || EOS || align=right | 14 km || 
|-id=993 bgcolor=#d6d6d6
| 6993 ||  || — || January 28, 1995 || Kushiro || S. Ueda, H. Kaneda || — || align=right | 12 km || 
|-id=994 bgcolor=#d6d6d6
| 6994 ||  || — || January 28, 1995 || Kushiro || S. Ueda, H. Kaneda || — || align=right | 6.4 km || 
|-id=995 bgcolor=#E9E9E9
| 6995 Minoyama ||  ||  || January 24, 1996 || Oizumi || T. Kobayashi || slow || align=right | 6.7 km || 
|-id=996 bgcolor=#d6d6d6
| 6996 Alvensleben || 2222 T-2 ||  || September 29, 1973 || Palomar || PLS || 7:4 || align=right | 19 km || 
|-id=997 bgcolor=#C2FFFF
| 6997 Laomedon || 3104 T-3 ||  || October 16, 1977 || Palomar || PLS || L5 || align=right | 38 km || 
|-id=998 bgcolor=#C2FFFF
| 6998 Tithonus || 3108 T-3 ||  || October 16, 1977 || Palomar || PLS || L5 || align=right | 28 km || 
|-id=999 bgcolor=#fefefe
| 6999 Meitner || 4379 T-3 ||  || October 16, 1977 || Palomar || PLS || FLO || align=right | 2.9 km || 
|-id=000 bgcolor=#fefefe
| 7000 Curie || 1939 VD ||  || November 6, 1939 || Uccle || F. Rigaux || — || align=right | 6.5 km || 
|}

References

External links 
 Discovery Circumstances: Numbered Minor Planets (5001)–(10000) (IAU Minor Planet Center)

0006